

325001–325100 

|-bgcolor=#fefefe
| 325001 ||  || — || January 30, 2008 || Mount Lemmon || Mount Lemmon Survey || MAS || align=right data-sort-value="0.61" | 610 m || 
|-id=002 bgcolor=#fefefe
| 325002 ||  || — || January 30, 2008 || Mount Lemmon || Mount Lemmon Survey || MAS || align=right data-sort-value="0.75" | 750 m || 
|-id=003 bgcolor=#fefefe
| 325003 ||  || — || January 30, 2008 || Mount Lemmon || Mount Lemmon Survey || — || align=right data-sort-value="0.94" | 940 m || 
|-id=004 bgcolor=#E9E9E9
| 325004 ||  || — || January 31, 2008 || Kitt Peak || Spacewatch || — || align=right | 2.1 km || 
|-id=005 bgcolor=#fefefe
| 325005 ||  || — || January 31, 2008 || Mount Lemmon || Mount Lemmon Survey || FLO || align=right data-sort-value="0.58" | 580 m || 
|-id=006 bgcolor=#fefefe
| 325006 ||  || — || January 31, 2008 || Catalina || CSS || ERI || align=right | 3.1 km || 
|-id=007 bgcolor=#fefefe
| 325007 ||  || — || January 30, 2008 || Catalina || CSS || — || align=right data-sort-value="0.84" | 840 m || 
|-id=008 bgcolor=#fefefe
| 325008 ||  || — || January 19, 2008 || Mount Lemmon || Mount Lemmon Survey || V || align=right data-sort-value="0.87" | 870 m || 
|-id=009 bgcolor=#fefefe
| 325009 ||  || — || January 31, 2008 || Catalina || CSS || — || align=right | 1.1 km || 
|-id=010 bgcolor=#E9E9E9
| 325010 ||  || — || January 18, 2008 || Mount Lemmon || Mount Lemmon Survey || — || align=right | 1.9 km || 
|-id=011 bgcolor=#E9E9E9
| 325011 ||  || — || January 30, 2008 || Mount Lemmon || Mount Lemmon Survey || — || align=right | 1.4 km || 
|-id=012 bgcolor=#fefefe
| 325012 ||  || — || January 20, 2008 || Kitt Peak || Spacewatch || — || align=right data-sort-value="0.98" | 980 m || 
|-id=013 bgcolor=#fefefe
| 325013 ||  || — || January 31, 2008 || Catalina || CSS || V || align=right data-sort-value="0.83" | 830 m || 
|-id=014 bgcolor=#fefefe
| 325014 ||  || — || February 7, 2008 || Mayhill || A. Lowe || — || align=right | 1.7 km || 
|-id=015 bgcolor=#fefefe
| 325015 ||  || — || February 3, 2008 || Kitt Peak || Spacewatch || NYS || align=right data-sort-value="0.61" | 610 m || 
|-id=016 bgcolor=#fefefe
| 325016 ||  || — || February 3, 2008 || Kitt Peak || Spacewatch || NYS || align=right data-sort-value="0.75" | 750 m || 
|-id=017 bgcolor=#E9E9E9
| 325017 ||  || — || September 12, 2005 || Kitt Peak || Spacewatch || — || align=right | 1.2 km || 
|-id=018 bgcolor=#fefefe
| 325018 ||  || — || February 3, 2008 || Kitt Peak || Spacewatch || NYS || align=right data-sort-value="0.58" | 580 m || 
|-id=019 bgcolor=#fefefe
| 325019 ||  || — || February 6, 2008 || Anderson Mesa || LONEOS || — || align=right | 1.1 km || 
|-id=020 bgcolor=#fefefe
| 325020 ||  || — || February 8, 2008 || Altschwendt || W. Ries || — || align=right data-sort-value="0.85" | 850 m || 
|-id=021 bgcolor=#fefefe
| 325021 ||  || — || February 1, 2008 || Kitt Peak || Spacewatch || V || align=right data-sort-value="0.98" | 980 m || 
|-id=022 bgcolor=#fefefe
| 325022 ||  || — || February 1, 2008 || Kitt Peak || Spacewatch || — || align=right data-sort-value="0.98" | 980 m || 
|-id=023 bgcolor=#fefefe
| 325023 ||  || — || August 18, 2006 || Kitt Peak || Spacewatch || — || align=right data-sort-value="0.78" | 780 m || 
|-id=024 bgcolor=#fefefe
| 325024 ||  || — || November 27, 2006 || Mount Lemmon || Mount Lemmon Survey || EUT || align=right data-sort-value="0.79" | 790 m || 
|-id=025 bgcolor=#fefefe
| 325025 ||  || — || February 2, 2008 || Kitt Peak || Spacewatch || MAS || align=right data-sort-value="0.70" | 700 m || 
|-id=026 bgcolor=#fefefe
| 325026 ||  || — || February 2, 2008 || Kitt Peak || Spacewatch || — || align=right data-sort-value="0.85" | 850 m || 
|-id=027 bgcolor=#fefefe
| 325027 ||  || — || February 2, 2008 || Mount Lemmon || Mount Lemmon Survey || MAS || align=right data-sort-value="0.82" | 820 m || 
|-id=028 bgcolor=#E9E9E9
| 325028 ||  || — || February 2, 2008 || Kitt Peak || Spacewatch || — || align=right data-sort-value="0.72" | 720 m || 
|-id=029 bgcolor=#E9E9E9
| 325029 ||  || — || February 3, 2008 || Kitt Peak || Spacewatch || — || align=right | 1.3 km || 
|-id=030 bgcolor=#fefefe
| 325030 ||  || — || November 18, 2007 || Mount Lemmon || Mount Lemmon Survey || MAS || align=right | 1.00 km || 
|-id=031 bgcolor=#E9E9E9
| 325031 ||  || — || February 7, 2008 || Kitt Peak || Spacewatch || — || align=right data-sort-value="0.86" | 860 m || 
|-id=032 bgcolor=#fefefe
| 325032 ||  || — || February 8, 2008 || La Sagra || OAM Obs. || — || align=right | 1.1 km || 
|-id=033 bgcolor=#fefefe
| 325033 ||  || — || February 9, 2008 || Dauban || F. Kugel || V || align=right data-sort-value="0.79" | 790 m || 
|-id=034 bgcolor=#fefefe
| 325034 ||  || — || February 10, 2008 || Altschwendt || W. Ries || — || align=right | 1.0 km || 
|-id=035 bgcolor=#E9E9E9
| 325035 ||  || — || February 8, 2008 || Kitt Peak || Spacewatch || — || align=right | 1.1 km || 
|-id=036 bgcolor=#fefefe
| 325036 ||  || — || February 8, 2008 || Mount Lemmon || Mount Lemmon Survey || — || align=right data-sort-value="0.94" | 940 m || 
|-id=037 bgcolor=#fefefe
| 325037 ||  || — || February 9, 2008 || Mount Lemmon || Mount Lemmon Survey || — || align=right data-sort-value="0.84" | 840 m || 
|-id=038 bgcolor=#fefefe
| 325038 ||  || — || February 9, 2008 || Kitt Peak || Spacewatch || — || align=right | 1.1 km || 
|-id=039 bgcolor=#fefefe
| 325039 ||  || — || February 9, 2008 || Mount Lemmon || Mount Lemmon Survey || — || align=right data-sort-value="0.91" | 910 m || 
|-id=040 bgcolor=#fefefe
| 325040 ||  || — || February 9, 2008 || Mount Lemmon || Mount Lemmon Survey || — || align=right | 1.0 km || 
|-id=041 bgcolor=#fefefe
| 325041 ||  || — || February 9, 2008 || Kitt Peak || Spacewatch || — || align=right | 1.0 km || 
|-id=042 bgcolor=#fefefe
| 325042 ||  || — || February 7, 2008 || Mount Lemmon || Mount Lemmon Survey || NYS || align=right data-sort-value="0.78" | 780 m || 
|-id=043 bgcolor=#fefefe
| 325043 ||  || — || January 31, 2008 || Mount Lemmon || Mount Lemmon Survey || NYS || align=right data-sort-value="0.59" | 590 m || 
|-id=044 bgcolor=#fefefe
| 325044 ||  || — || February 8, 2008 || Kitt Peak || Spacewatch || NYS || align=right data-sort-value="0.83" | 830 m || 
|-id=045 bgcolor=#fefefe
| 325045 ||  || — || February 8, 2008 || Mount Lemmon || Mount Lemmon Survey || MAS || align=right data-sort-value="0.66" | 660 m || 
|-id=046 bgcolor=#fefefe
| 325046 ||  || — || February 8, 2008 || Mount Lemmon || Mount Lemmon Survey || — || align=right data-sort-value="0.90" | 900 m || 
|-id=047 bgcolor=#fefefe
| 325047 ||  || — || February 8, 2008 || Kitt Peak || Spacewatch || MAS || align=right data-sort-value="0.82" | 820 m || 
|-id=048 bgcolor=#fefefe
| 325048 ||  || — || February 8, 2008 || Kitt Peak || Spacewatch || — || align=right data-sort-value="0.98" | 980 m || 
|-id=049 bgcolor=#E9E9E9
| 325049 ||  || — || February 9, 2008 || Kitt Peak || Spacewatch || — || align=right | 1.7 km || 
|-id=050 bgcolor=#fefefe
| 325050 ||  || — || February 9, 2008 || Kitt Peak || Spacewatch || V || align=right data-sort-value="0.61" | 610 m || 
|-id=051 bgcolor=#E9E9E9
| 325051 ||  || — || February 9, 2008 || Kitt Peak || Spacewatch || — || align=right | 2.1 km || 
|-id=052 bgcolor=#fefefe
| 325052 ||  || — || September 27, 2006 || Mount Lemmon || Mount Lemmon Survey || NYS || align=right data-sort-value="0.84" | 840 m || 
|-id=053 bgcolor=#fefefe
| 325053 ||  || — || February 6, 2008 || Catalina || CSS || — || align=right data-sort-value="0.76" | 760 m || 
|-id=054 bgcolor=#fefefe
| 325054 ||  || — || February 7, 2008 || Catalina || CSS || — || align=right | 1.1 km || 
|-id=055 bgcolor=#fefefe
| 325055 ||  || — || February 10, 2008 || Catalina || CSS || — || align=right | 1.4 km || 
|-id=056 bgcolor=#fefefe
| 325056 ||  || — || February 1, 2008 || Kitt Peak || Spacewatch || MAS || align=right data-sort-value="0.62" | 620 m || 
|-id=057 bgcolor=#fefefe
| 325057 ||  || — || August 18, 2006 || Kitt Peak || Spacewatch || — || align=right data-sort-value="0.95" | 950 m || 
|-id=058 bgcolor=#fefefe
| 325058 ||  || — || February 8, 2008 || Kitt Peak || Spacewatch || — || align=right data-sort-value="0.82" | 820 m || 
|-id=059 bgcolor=#E9E9E9
| 325059 ||  || — || February 13, 2008 || Mount Lemmon || Mount Lemmon Survey || — || align=right | 1.5 km || 
|-id=060 bgcolor=#fefefe
| 325060 ||  || — || February 10, 2008 || Mount Lemmon || Mount Lemmon Survey || ERI || align=right | 2.0 km || 
|-id=061 bgcolor=#d6d6d6
| 325061 ||  || — || February 6, 2008 || Catalina || CSS || — || align=right | 4.0 km || 
|-id=062 bgcolor=#E9E9E9
| 325062 ||  || — || February 10, 2008 || Kitt Peak || Spacewatch || — || align=right | 1.2 km || 
|-id=063 bgcolor=#fefefe
| 325063 ||  || — || February 6, 2008 || Socorro || LINEAR || V || align=right data-sort-value="0.90" | 900 m || 
|-id=064 bgcolor=#E9E9E9
| 325064 ||  || — || February 11, 2008 || Mount Lemmon || Mount Lemmon Survey || — || align=right | 3.2 km || 
|-id=065 bgcolor=#E9E9E9
| 325065 ||  || — || March 9, 2004 || Palomar || NEAT || EUN || align=right | 1.5 km || 
|-id=066 bgcolor=#fefefe
| 325066 ||  || — || February 3, 2008 || Mount Lemmon || Mount Lemmon Survey || V || align=right data-sort-value="0.75" | 750 m || 
|-id=067 bgcolor=#fefefe
| 325067 ||  || — || February 10, 2008 || Mount Lemmon || Mount Lemmon Survey || V || align=right data-sort-value="0.75" | 750 m || 
|-id=068 bgcolor=#E9E9E9
| 325068 ||  || — || February 10, 2008 || Mount Lemmon || Mount Lemmon Survey || MAR || align=right | 1.1 km || 
|-id=069 bgcolor=#E9E9E9
| 325069 ||  || — || February 10, 2008 || Mount Lemmon || Mount Lemmon Survey || — || align=right | 2.1 km || 
|-id=070 bgcolor=#fefefe
| 325070 ||  || — || February 13, 2008 || Catalina || CSS || — || align=right | 1.1 km || 
|-id=071 bgcolor=#fefefe
| 325071 ||  || — || January 12, 2008 || Catalina || CSS || — || align=right | 1.2 km || 
|-id=072 bgcolor=#fefefe
| 325072 ||  || — || February 24, 2008 || Kitt Peak || Spacewatch || — || align=right | 1.0 km || 
|-id=073 bgcolor=#fefefe
| 325073 ||  || — || February 24, 2008 || Mount Lemmon || Mount Lemmon Survey || MAS || align=right data-sort-value="0.75" | 750 m || 
|-id=074 bgcolor=#fefefe
| 325074 ||  || — || January 20, 2008 || Kitt Peak || Spacewatch || — || align=right | 1.3 km || 
|-id=075 bgcolor=#fefefe
| 325075 ||  || — || February 24, 2008 || Kitt Peak || Spacewatch || — || align=right data-sort-value="0.99" | 990 m || 
|-id=076 bgcolor=#fefefe
| 325076 ||  || — || February 24, 2008 || Mount Lemmon || Mount Lemmon Survey || NYS || align=right data-sort-value="0.90" | 900 m || 
|-id=077 bgcolor=#fefefe
| 325077 ||  || — || February 1, 2008 || Mount Lemmon || Mount Lemmon Survey || NYS || align=right data-sort-value="0.56" | 560 m || 
|-id=078 bgcolor=#fefefe
| 325078 ||  || — || December 31, 2007 || Kitt Peak || Spacewatch || — || align=right data-sort-value="0.79" | 790 m || 
|-id=079 bgcolor=#fefefe
| 325079 ||  || — || February 24, 2008 || Mount Lemmon || Mount Lemmon Survey || MAS || align=right data-sort-value="0.71" | 710 m || 
|-id=080 bgcolor=#fefefe
| 325080 ||  || — || February 24, 2008 || Kitt Peak || Spacewatch || V || align=right data-sort-value="0.77" | 770 m || 
|-id=081 bgcolor=#fefefe
| 325081 ||  || — || February 26, 2008 || Kitt Peak || Spacewatch || — || align=right data-sort-value="0.86" | 860 m || 
|-id=082 bgcolor=#fefefe
| 325082 ||  || — || February 26, 2008 || Mount Lemmon || Mount Lemmon Survey || NYS || align=right data-sort-value="0.76" | 760 m || 
|-id=083 bgcolor=#fefefe
| 325083 ||  || — || February 29, 2008 || Purple Mountain || PMO NEO || — || align=right | 1.5 km || 
|-id=084 bgcolor=#fefefe
| 325084 ||  || — || December 30, 2007 || Kitt Peak || Spacewatch || NYS || align=right data-sort-value="0.67" | 670 m || 
|-id=085 bgcolor=#fefefe
| 325085 ||  || — || February 27, 2008 || Kitt Peak || Spacewatch || NYS || align=right data-sort-value="0.76" | 760 m || 
|-id=086 bgcolor=#fefefe
| 325086 ||  || — || February 27, 2008 || Mount Lemmon || Mount Lemmon Survey || V || align=right data-sort-value="0.67" | 670 m || 
|-id=087 bgcolor=#E9E9E9
| 325087 ||  || — || February 27, 2008 || Kitt Peak || Spacewatch || — || align=right | 1.7 km || 
|-id=088 bgcolor=#fefefe
| 325088 ||  || — || February 28, 2008 || Mount Lemmon || Mount Lemmon Survey || NYS || align=right data-sort-value="0.71" | 710 m || 
|-id=089 bgcolor=#fefefe
| 325089 ||  || — || February 28, 2008 || Kitt Peak || Spacewatch || — || align=right data-sort-value="0.94" | 940 m || 
|-id=090 bgcolor=#fefefe
| 325090 ||  || — || February 28, 2008 || Mount Lemmon || Mount Lemmon Survey || — || align=right | 1.0 km || 
|-id=091 bgcolor=#E9E9E9
| 325091 ||  || — || February 29, 2008 || Mount Lemmon || Mount Lemmon Survey || — || align=right | 1.3 km || 
|-id=092 bgcolor=#E9E9E9
| 325092 ||  || — || February 29, 2008 || Kitt Peak || Spacewatch || — || align=right | 1.1 km || 
|-id=093 bgcolor=#fefefe
| 325093 ||  || — || February 26, 2008 || Anderson Mesa || LONEOS || NYS || align=right data-sort-value="0.81" | 810 m || 
|-id=094 bgcolor=#E9E9E9
| 325094 ||  || — || February 28, 2008 || Mount Lemmon || Mount Lemmon Survey || — || align=right data-sort-value="0.94" | 940 m || 
|-id=095 bgcolor=#E9E9E9
| 325095 ||  || — || February 29, 2008 || Kitt Peak || Spacewatch || — || align=right | 1.9 km || 
|-id=096 bgcolor=#fefefe
| 325096 ||  || — || February 27, 2008 || Mount Lemmon || Mount Lemmon Survey || — || align=right | 1.1 km || 
|-id=097 bgcolor=#d6d6d6
| 325097 ||  || — || February 28, 2008 || Mount Lemmon || Mount Lemmon Survey || — || align=right | 3.6 km || 
|-id=098 bgcolor=#E9E9E9
| 325098 ||  || — || February 27, 2008 || Mount Lemmon || Mount Lemmon Survey || MIS || align=right | 2.7 km || 
|-id=099 bgcolor=#E9E9E9
| 325099 ||  || — || February 28, 2008 || Kitt Peak || Spacewatch || MAR || align=right | 1.2 km || 
|-id=100 bgcolor=#E9E9E9
| 325100 ||  || — || February 28, 2008 || Kitt Peak || Spacewatch || — || align=right | 1.2 km || 
|}

325101–325200 

|-bgcolor=#E9E9E9
| 325101 ||  || — || February 18, 2008 || Mount Lemmon || Mount Lemmon Survey || EUN || align=right | 1.8 km || 
|-id=102 bgcolor=#FFC2E0
| 325102 ||  || — || March 4, 2008 || Siding Spring || SSS || ATEcritical || align=right data-sort-value="0.36" | 360 m || 
|-id=103 bgcolor=#fefefe
| 325103 ||  || — || March 1, 2008 || Kitt Peak || Spacewatch || — || align=right | 1.7 km || 
|-id=104 bgcolor=#E9E9E9
| 325104 ||  || — || March 1, 2008 || Kitt Peak || Spacewatch || — || align=right | 2.2 km || 
|-id=105 bgcolor=#fefefe
| 325105 ||  || — || March 2, 2008 || Kitt Peak || Spacewatch || V || align=right data-sort-value="0.99" | 990 m || 
|-id=106 bgcolor=#E9E9E9
| 325106 ||  || — || March 4, 2008 || Mount Lemmon || Mount Lemmon Survey || — || align=right | 2.3 km || 
|-id=107 bgcolor=#E9E9E9
| 325107 ||  || — || March 1, 2008 || Kitt Peak || Spacewatch || — || align=right | 1.5 km || 
|-id=108 bgcolor=#fefefe
| 325108 ||  || — || July 7, 2002 || Kitt Peak || Spacewatch || NYS || align=right data-sort-value="0.70" | 700 m || 
|-id=109 bgcolor=#E9E9E9
| 325109 ||  || — || March 1, 2008 || Mount Lemmon || Mount Lemmon Survey || — || align=right data-sort-value="0.72" | 720 m || 
|-id=110 bgcolor=#E9E9E9
| 325110 ||  || — || March 4, 2008 || Kitt Peak || Spacewatch || — || align=right | 1.0 km || 
|-id=111 bgcolor=#fefefe
| 325111 ||  || — || March 5, 2008 || Mount Lemmon || Mount Lemmon Survey || — || align=right | 1.2 km || 
|-id=112 bgcolor=#fefefe
| 325112 ||  || — || March 5, 2008 || Kitt Peak || Spacewatch || NYS || align=right data-sort-value="0.75" | 750 m || 
|-id=113 bgcolor=#E9E9E9
| 325113 ||  || — || March 5, 2008 || Kitt Peak || Spacewatch || — || align=right data-sort-value="0.94" | 940 m || 
|-id=114 bgcolor=#fefefe
| 325114 ||  || — || February 13, 2008 || Mount Lemmon || Mount Lemmon Survey || critical || align=right data-sort-value="0.71" | 710 m || 
|-id=115 bgcolor=#E9E9E9
| 325115 ||  || — || March 5, 2008 || Kitt Peak || Spacewatch || — || align=right data-sort-value="0.95" | 950 m || 
|-id=116 bgcolor=#E9E9E9
| 325116 ||  || — || March 5, 2008 || Kitt Peak || Spacewatch || — || align=right | 1.5 km || 
|-id=117 bgcolor=#fefefe
| 325117 ||  || — || March 6, 2008 || Mount Lemmon || Mount Lemmon Survey || MAS || align=right data-sort-value="0.76" | 760 m || 
|-id=118 bgcolor=#E9E9E9
| 325118 ||  || — || March 9, 2008 || Kitt Peak || Spacewatch || — || align=right data-sort-value="0.99" | 990 m || 
|-id=119 bgcolor=#E9E9E9
| 325119 ||  || — || March 9, 2008 || Mount Lemmon || Mount Lemmon Survey || — || align=right | 1.1 km || 
|-id=120 bgcolor=#E9E9E9
| 325120 ||  || — || February 12, 2008 || Mount Lemmon || Mount Lemmon Survey || — || align=right | 1.0 km || 
|-id=121 bgcolor=#fefefe
| 325121 ||  || — || March 6, 2008 || Mount Lemmon || Mount Lemmon Survey || — || align=right data-sort-value="0.87" | 870 m || 
|-id=122 bgcolor=#E9E9E9
| 325122 ||  || — || March 10, 2008 || Kitt Peak || Spacewatch || — || align=right | 1.7 km || 
|-id=123 bgcolor=#E9E9E9
| 325123 ||  || — || March 7, 2008 || Kitt Peak || Spacewatch || — || align=right | 1.0 km || 
|-id=124 bgcolor=#fefefe
| 325124 ||  || — || March 11, 2008 || Catalina || CSS || — || align=right data-sort-value="0.99" | 990 m || 
|-id=125 bgcolor=#fefefe
| 325125 ||  || — || March 8, 2008 || Mount Lemmon || Mount Lemmon Survey || V || align=right data-sort-value="0.81" | 810 m || 
|-id=126 bgcolor=#fefefe
| 325126 ||  || — || March 8, 2008 || Mount Lemmon || Mount Lemmon Survey || — || align=right data-sort-value="0.91" | 910 m || 
|-id=127 bgcolor=#fefefe
| 325127 ||  || — || March 9, 2008 || Mount Lemmon || Mount Lemmon Survey || V || align=right | 1.1 km || 
|-id=128 bgcolor=#E9E9E9
| 325128 ||  || — || March 9, 2008 || Kitt Peak || Spacewatch || — || align=right data-sort-value="0.98" | 980 m || 
|-id=129 bgcolor=#E9E9E9
| 325129 ||  || — || March 9, 2008 || Kitt Peak || Spacewatch || — || align=right | 1.2 km || 
|-id=130 bgcolor=#fefefe
| 325130 ||  || — || March 10, 2008 || Kitt Peak || Spacewatch || — || align=right | 1.0 km || 
|-id=131 bgcolor=#fefefe
| 325131 ||  || — || March 10, 2008 || Kitt Peak || Spacewatch || NYS || align=right data-sort-value="0.73" | 730 m || 
|-id=132 bgcolor=#E9E9E9
| 325132 ||  || — || February 29, 2008 || Kitt Peak || Spacewatch || — || align=right | 1.6 km || 
|-id=133 bgcolor=#fefefe
| 325133 ||  || — || March 11, 2008 || Kitt Peak || Spacewatch || — || align=right | 1.7 km || 
|-id=134 bgcolor=#E9E9E9
| 325134 ||  || — || March 14, 2008 || Catalina || CSS || — || align=right | 2.1 km || 
|-id=135 bgcolor=#E9E9E9
| 325135 ||  || — || March 13, 2008 || Mount Lemmon || Mount Lemmon Survey || — || align=right | 1.2 km || 
|-id=136 bgcolor=#E9E9E9
| 325136 Zhongnanshan ||  ||  || March 2, 2008 || XuYi || PMO NEO || — || align=right | 2.3 km || 
|-id=137 bgcolor=#fefefe
| 325137 ||  || — || March 4, 2008 || Kitt Peak || Spacewatch || — || align=right | 1.2 km || 
|-id=138 bgcolor=#fefefe
| 325138 ||  || — || March 7, 2008 || Catalina || CSS || — || align=right data-sort-value="0.80" | 800 m || 
|-id=139 bgcolor=#E9E9E9
| 325139 ||  || — || March 4, 2008 || Mount Lemmon || Mount Lemmon Survey || — || align=right | 1.5 km || 
|-id=140 bgcolor=#E9E9E9
| 325140 ||  || — || March 10, 2008 || Kitt Peak || Spacewatch || — || align=right | 1.4 km || 
|-id=141 bgcolor=#E9E9E9
| 325141 ||  || — || March 10, 2008 || Kitt Peak || Spacewatch || — || align=right data-sort-value="0.99" | 990 m || 
|-id=142 bgcolor=#E9E9E9
| 325142 ||  || — || March 9, 2008 || Kitt Peak || Spacewatch || — || align=right | 1.2 km || 
|-id=143 bgcolor=#E9E9E9
| 325143 ||  || — || March 4, 2008 || Mount Lemmon || Mount Lemmon Survey || RAF || align=right data-sort-value="0.97" | 970 m || 
|-id=144 bgcolor=#E9E9E9
| 325144 ||  || — || March 2, 2008 || Kitt Peak || Spacewatch || — || align=right | 1.0 km || 
|-id=145 bgcolor=#E9E9E9
| 325145 ||  || — || March 13, 2008 || Kitt Peak || Spacewatch || — || align=right | 2.4 km || 
|-id=146 bgcolor=#E9E9E9
| 325146 ||  || — || March 12, 2008 || Mount Lemmon || Mount Lemmon Survey || — || align=right | 1.3 km || 
|-id=147 bgcolor=#E9E9E9
| 325147 ||  || — || March 4, 2008 || Mount Lemmon || Mount Lemmon Survey || — || align=right data-sort-value="0.83" | 830 m || 
|-id=148 bgcolor=#E9E9E9
| 325148 ||  || — || March 5, 2008 || Mount Lemmon || Mount Lemmon Survey || — || align=right | 1.9 km || 
|-id=149 bgcolor=#fefefe
| 325149 ||  || — || March 6, 2008 || Catalina || CSS || LCI || align=right | 1.5 km || 
|-id=150 bgcolor=#E9E9E9
| 325150 ||  || — || March 7, 2008 || Mount Lemmon || Mount Lemmon Survey || EUN || align=right | 1.8 km || 
|-id=151 bgcolor=#E9E9E9
| 325151 ||  || — || March 14, 2008 || Catalina || CSS || — || align=right | 1.7 km || 
|-id=152 bgcolor=#FA8072
| 325152 ||  || — || March 15, 2008 || Kitt Peak || Spacewatch || — || align=right | 3.8 km || 
|-id=153 bgcolor=#fefefe
| 325153 ||  || — || March 25, 2008 || Kitt Peak || Spacewatch || — || align=right data-sort-value="0.97" | 970 m || 
|-id=154 bgcolor=#E9E9E9
| 325154 ||  || — || March 25, 2008 || Kitt Peak || Spacewatch || — || align=right data-sort-value="0.95" | 950 m || 
|-id=155 bgcolor=#fefefe
| 325155 ||  || — || March 26, 2008 || Kitt Peak || Spacewatch || — || align=right data-sort-value="0.98" | 980 m || 
|-id=156 bgcolor=#E9E9E9
| 325156 ||  || — || March 26, 2008 || Mount Lemmon || Mount Lemmon Survey || — || align=right | 1.4 km || 
|-id=157 bgcolor=#E9E9E9
| 325157 ||  || — || March 26, 2008 || Mount Lemmon || Mount Lemmon Survey || — || align=right | 1.6 km || 
|-id=158 bgcolor=#fefefe
| 325158 ||  || — || March 27, 2008 || Mount Lemmon || Mount Lemmon Survey || NYS || align=right data-sort-value="0.75" | 750 m || 
|-id=159 bgcolor=#E9E9E9
| 325159 ||  || — || March 27, 2008 || Mount Lemmon || Mount Lemmon Survey || — || align=right | 3.1 km || 
|-id=160 bgcolor=#E9E9E9
| 325160 ||  || — || March 27, 2008 || Kitt Peak || Spacewatch || — || align=right | 1.8 km || 
|-id=161 bgcolor=#E9E9E9
| 325161 ||  || — || March 27, 2008 || Kitt Peak || Spacewatch || BAR || align=right | 1.2 km || 
|-id=162 bgcolor=#E9E9E9
| 325162 ||  || — || March 27, 2008 || Kitt Peak || Spacewatch || — || align=right | 1.0 km || 
|-id=163 bgcolor=#E9E9E9
| 325163 ||  || — || March 28, 2008 || Kitt Peak || Spacewatch || — || align=right | 1.7 km || 
|-id=164 bgcolor=#E9E9E9
| 325164 ||  || — || March 28, 2008 || Kitt Peak || Spacewatch || — || align=right | 1.9 km || 
|-id=165 bgcolor=#E9E9E9
| 325165 ||  || — || March 28, 2008 || Mount Lemmon || Mount Lemmon Survey || — || align=right | 1.1 km || 
|-id=166 bgcolor=#fefefe
| 325166 ||  || — || March 28, 2008 || Mount Lemmon || Mount Lemmon Survey || NYS || align=right data-sort-value="0.77" | 770 m || 
|-id=167 bgcolor=#E9E9E9
| 325167 ||  || — || March 28, 2008 || Mount Lemmon || Mount Lemmon Survey || — || align=right | 2.2 km || 
|-id=168 bgcolor=#E9E9E9
| 325168 ||  || — || March 28, 2008 || Mount Lemmon || Mount Lemmon Survey || — || align=right data-sort-value="0.94" | 940 m || 
|-id=169 bgcolor=#E9E9E9
| 325169 ||  || — || March 28, 2008 || Mount Lemmon || Mount Lemmon Survey || — || align=right | 1.2 km || 
|-id=170 bgcolor=#E9E9E9
| 325170 ||  || — || March 28, 2008 || Mount Lemmon || Mount Lemmon Survey || — || align=right | 1.0 km || 
|-id=171 bgcolor=#E9E9E9
| 325171 ||  || — || March 28, 2008 || Mount Lemmon || Mount Lemmon Survey || — || align=right | 1.9 km || 
|-id=172 bgcolor=#E9E9E9
| 325172 ||  || — || November 22, 2006 || Catalina || CSS || HNS || align=right | 1.2 km || 
|-id=173 bgcolor=#E9E9E9
| 325173 ||  || — || March 28, 2008 || Mount Lemmon || Mount Lemmon Survey || — || align=right | 1.4 km || 
|-id=174 bgcolor=#fefefe
| 325174 ||  || — || March 28, 2008 || Mount Lemmon || Mount Lemmon Survey || V || align=right data-sort-value="0.93" | 930 m || 
|-id=175 bgcolor=#fefefe
| 325175 ||  || — || March 27, 2008 || Kitt Peak || Spacewatch || — || align=right | 1.3 km || 
|-id=176 bgcolor=#E9E9E9
| 325176 ||  || — || March 28, 2008 || Kitt Peak || Spacewatch || HEN || align=right | 1.2 km || 
|-id=177 bgcolor=#E9E9E9
| 325177 ||  || — || March 28, 2008 || Kitt Peak || Spacewatch || — || align=right data-sort-value="0.87" | 870 m || 
|-id=178 bgcolor=#E9E9E9
| 325178 ||  || — || March 28, 2008 || Mount Lemmon || Mount Lemmon Survey || — || align=right | 1.7 km || 
|-id=179 bgcolor=#E9E9E9
| 325179 ||  || — || March 28, 2008 || Kitt Peak || Spacewatch || — || align=right | 1.7 km || 
|-id=180 bgcolor=#E9E9E9
| 325180 ||  || — || March 31, 2008 || Mount Lemmon || Mount Lemmon Survey || — || align=right data-sort-value="0.90" | 900 m || 
|-id=181 bgcolor=#E9E9E9
| 325181 ||  || — || November 11, 2006 || Mount Lemmon || Mount Lemmon Survey || — || align=right | 1.1 km || 
|-id=182 bgcolor=#E9E9E9
| 325182 ||  || — || March 27, 2008 || Mount Lemmon || Mount Lemmon Survey || — || align=right data-sort-value="0.99" | 990 m || 
|-id=183 bgcolor=#E9E9E9
| 325183 ||  || — || March 28, 2008 || Kitt Peak || Spacewatch || MAR || align=right | 1.0 km || 
|-id=184 bgcolor=#E9E9E9
| 325184 ||  || — || March 28, 2008 || Kitt Peak || Spacewatch || — || align=right | 1.4 km || 
|-id=185 bgcolor=#fefefe
| 325185 ||  || — || March 29, 2008 || Mount Lemmon || Mount Lemmon Survey || MAS || align=right data-sort-value="0.71" | 710 m || 
|-id=186 bgcolor=#fefefe
| 325186 ||  || — || March 29, 2008 || Mount Lemmon || Mount Lemmon Survey || MAS || align=right data-sort-value="0.82" | 820 m || 
|-id=187 bgcolor=#E9E9E9
| 325187 ||  || — || March 29, 2008 || Kitt Peak || Spacewatch || — || align=right | 2.3 km || 
|-id=188 bgcolor=#E9E9E9
| 325188 ||  || — || March 29, 2008 || Catalina || CSS || ADE || align=right | 2.3 km || 
|-id=189 bgcolor=#E9E9E9
| 325189 ||  || — || March 29, 2008 || Mount Lemmon || Mount Lemmon Survey || — || align=right | 1.4 km || 
|-id=190 bgcolor=#E9E9E9
| 325190 ||  || — || March 30, 2008 || Kitt Peak || Spacewatch || — || align=right | 1.3 km || 
|-id=191 bgcolor=#d6d6d6
| 325191 ||  || — || March 30, 2008 || Kitt Peak || Spacewatch || — || align=right | 3.0 km || 
|-id=192 bgcolor=#E9E9E9
| 325192 ||  || — || March 31, 2008 || Kitt Peak || Spacewatch || — || align=right data-sort-value="0.96" | 960 m || 
|-id=193 bgcolor=#E9E9E9
| 325193 ||  || — || March 31, 2008 || Mount Lemmon || Mount Lemmon Survey || — || align=right | 1.4 km || 
|-id=194 bgcolor=#E9E9E9
| 325194 ||  || — || March 31, 2008 || Kitt Peak || Spacewatch || MRX || align=right | 1.1 km || 
|-id=195 bgcolor=#E9E9E9
| 325195 ||  || — || March 31, 2008 || Mount Lemmon || Mount Lemmon Survey || — || align=right | 1.3 km || 
|-id=196 bgcolor=#E9E9E9
| 325196 ||  || — || March 31, 2008 || Kitt Peak || Spacewatch || — || align=right | 2.7 km || 
|-id=197 bgcolor=#E9E9E9
| 325197 ||  || — || March 31, 2008 || Mount Lemmon || Mount Lemmon Survey || — || align=right | 2.2 km || 
|-id=198 bgcolor=#E9E9E9
| 325198 ||  || — || March 21, 1999 || Apache Point || SDSS || — || align=right | 2.4 km || 
|-id=199 bgcolor=#E9E9E9
| 325199 ||  || — || March 30, 2008 || Kitt Peak || Spacewatch || — || align=right | 1.8 km || 
|-id=200 bgcolor=#E9E9E9
| 325200 ||  || — || March 29, 2008 || Kitt Peak || Spacewatch || — || align=right | 2.7 km || 
|}

325201–325300 

|-bgcolor=#E9E9E9
| 325201 ||  || — || March 31, 2008 || Mount Lemmon || Mount Lemmon Survey || KON || align=right | 2.7 km || 
|-id=202 bgcolor=#E9E9E9
| 325202 ||  || — || March 28, 2008 || Mount Lemmon || Mount Lemmon Survey || — || align=right | 1.1 km || 
|-id=203 bgcolor=#E9E9E9
| 325203 ||  || — || March 30, 2008 || Kitt Peak || Spacewatch || — || align=right data-sort-value="0.80" | 800 m || 
|-id=204 bgcolor=#E9E9E9
| 325204 ||  || — || March 29, 2008 || Kitt Peak || Spacewatch || HNS || align=right | 1.6 km || 
|-id=205 bgcolor=#E9E9E9
| 325205 ||  || — || March 30, 2008 || Socorro || LINEAR || — || align=right | 1.0 km || 
|-id=206 bgcolor=#E9E9E9
| 325206 ||  || — || March 30, 2008 || Kitt Peak || Spacewatch || — || align=right | 1.4 km || 
|-id=207 bgcolor=#E9E9E9
| 325207 ||  || — || March 30, 2008 || Catalina || CSS || — || align=right | 1.4 km || 
|-id=208 bgcolor=#E9E9E9
| 325208 ||  || — || March 30, 2008 || Kitt Peak || Spacewatch || — || align=right | 1.8 km || 
|-id=209 bgcolor=#fefefe
| 325209 ||  || — || April 1, 2008 || Kitt Peak || Spacewatch || — || align=right data-sort-value="0.84" | 840 m || 
|-id=210 bgcolor=#E9E9E9
| 325210 ||  || — || August 9, 2000 || Kitt Peak || Spacewatch || WIT || align=right data-sort-value="0.97" | 970 m || 
|-id=211 bgcolor=#E9E9E9
| 325211 ||  || — || April 1, 2008 || Kitt Peak || Spacewatch || — || align=right | 1.0 km || 
|-id=212 bgcolor=#E9E9E9
| 325212 ||  || — || April 1, 2008 || Kitt Peak || Spacewatch || — || align=right | 2.3 km || 
|-id=213 bgcolor=#E9E9E9
| 325213 ||  || — || April 1, 2008 || Kitt Peak || Spacewatch || — || align=right | 2.3 km || 
|-id=214 bgcolor=#E9E9E9
| 325214 ||  || — || April 3, 2008 || Mount Lemmon || Mount Lemmon Survey || — || align=right data-sort-value="0.97" | 970 m || 
|-id=215 bgcolor=#E9E9E9
| 325215 ||  || — || April 4, 2008 || Kitt Peak || Spacewatch || — || align=right | 2.3 km || 
|-id=216 bgcolor=#E9E9E9
| 325216 ||  || — || April 4, 2008 || Catalina || CSS || — || align=right | 1.4 km || 
|-id=217 bgcolor=#E9E9E9
| 325217 ||  || — || April 8, 2008 || Desert Eagle || W. K. Y. Yeung || — || align=right | 2.2 km || 
|-id=218 bgcolor=#E9E9E9
| 325218 ||  || — || April 10, 2008 || Desert Eagle || W. K. Y. Yeung || — || align=right | 1.7 km || 
|-id=219 bgcolor=#E9E9E9
| 325219 ||  || — || March 5, 2008 || Kitt Peak || Spacewatch || — || align=right | 1.1 km || 
|-id=220 bgcolor=#E9E9E9
| 325220 ||  || — || April 3, 2008 || Mount Lemmon || Mount Lemmon Survey || — || align=right | 1.4 km || 
|-id=221 bgcolor=#E9E9E9
| 325221 ||  || — || March 11, 2008 || Kitt Peak || Spacewatch || — || align=right | 1.4 km || 
|-id=222 bgcolor=#E9E9E9
| 325222 ||  || — || April 3, 2008 || Kitt Peak || Spacewatch || — || align=right | 1.5 km || 
|-id=223 bgcolor=#E9E9E9
| 325223 ||  || — || April 3, 2008 || Kitt Peak || Spacewatch || — || align=right | 1.9 km || 
|-id=224 bgcolor=#E9E9E9
| 325224 ||  || — || April 3, 2008 || Mount Lemmon || Mount Lemmon Survey || EUN || align=right | 1.9 km || 
|-id=225 bgcolor=#E9E9E9
| 325225 ||  || — || April 3, 2008 || Mount Lemmon || Mount Lemmon Survey || — || align=right | 2.1 km || 
|-id=226 bgcolor=#E9E9E9
| 325226 ||  || — || April 3, 2008 || Kitt Peak || Spacewatch || — || align=right | 1.6 km || 
|-id=227 bgcolor=#fefefe
| 325227 ||  || — || April 4, 2008 || Mount Lemmon || Mount Lemmon Survey || NYS || align=right data-sort-value="0.71" | 710 m || 
|-id=228 bgcolor=#E9E9E9
| 325228 ||  || — || April 4, 2008 || Kitt Peak || Spacewatch || — || align=right | 1.3 km || 
|-id=229 bgcolor=#E9E9E9
| 325229 ||  || — || April 4, 2008 || Mount Lemmon || Mount Lemmon Survey || WIT || align=right data-sort-value="0.89" | 890 m || 
|-id=230 bgcolor=#E9E9E9
| 325230 ||  || — || April 4, 2008 || Mount Lemmon || Mount Lemmon Survey || — || align=right | 1.1 km || 
|-id=231 bgcolor=#E9E9E9
| 325231 ||  || — || April 4, 2008 || Kitt Peak || Spacewatch || — || align=right | 1.8 km || 
|-id=232 bgcolor=#E9E9E9
| 325232 ||  || — || April 5, 2008 || Kitt Peak || Spacewatch || — || align=right | 1.7 km || 
|-id=233 bgcolor=#E9E9E9
| 325233 ||  || — || April 5, 2008 || Mount Lemmon || Mount Lemmon Survey || — || align=right | 1.2 km || 
|-id=234 bgcolor=#E9E9E9
| 325234 ||  || — || April 5, 2008 || Mount Lemmon || Mount Lemmon Survey || — || align=right | 1.3 km || 
|-id=235 bgcolor=#E9E9E9
| 325235 ||  || — || April 5, 2008 || Catalina || CSS || — || align=right | 1.0 km || 
|-id=236 bgcolor=#E9E9E9
| 325236 ||  || — || April 5, 2008 || Kitt Peak || Spacewatch || MIS || align=right | 2.5 km || 
|-id=237 bgcolor=#fefefe
| 325237 ||  || — || April 6, 2008 || Kitt Peak || Spacewatch || MAS || align=right data-sort-value="0.79" | 790 m || 
|-id=238 bgcolor=#E9E9E9
| 325238 ||  || — || April 6, 2008 || Kitt Peak || Spacewatch || — || align=right | 1.5 km || 
|-id=239 bgcolor=#E9E9E9
| 325239 ||  || — || April 6, 2008 || Kitt Peak || Spacewatch || — || align=right | 2.6 km || 
|-id=240 bgcolor=#E9E9E9
| 325240 ||  || — || April 6, 2008 || Kitt Peak || Spacewatch || — || align=right | 2.0 km || 
|-id=241 bgcolor=#E9E9E9
| 325241 ||  || — || April 6, 2008 || Mount Lemmon || Mount Lemmon Survey || — || align=right | 3.3 km || 
|-id=242 bgcolor=#fefefe
| 325242 ||  || — || April 7, 2008 || Kitt Peak || Spacewatch || V || align=right data-sort-value="0.69" | 690 m || 
|-id=243 bgcolor=#E9E9E9
| 325243 ||  || — || April 7, 2008 || Kitt Peak || Spacewatch || — || align=right data-sort-value="0.94" | 940 m || 
|-id=244 bgcolor=#E9E9E9
| 325244 ||  || — || April 7, 2008 || Kitt Peak || Spacewatch || — || align=right | 2.2 km || 
|-id=245 bgcolor=#E9E9E9
| 325245 ||  || — || April 7, 2008 || Kitt Peak || Spacewatch || — || align=right | 2.8 km || 
|-id=246 bgcolor=#E9E9E9
| 325246 ||  || — || April 7, 2008 || Kitt Peak || Spacewatch || — || align=right | 1.5 km || 
|-id=247 bgcolor=#E9E9E9
| 325247 ||  || — || April 7, 2008 || Kitt Peak || Spacewatch || — || align=right | 1.2 km || 
|-id=248 bgcolor=#E9E9E9
| 325248 ||  || — || April 7, 2008 || Mount Lemmon || Mount Lemmon Survey || — || align=right | 2.4 km || 
|-id=249 bgcolor=#E9E9E9
| 325249 ||  || — || April 7, 2008 || Kitt Peak || Spacewatch || PAD || align=right | 2.0 km || 
|-id=250 bgcolor=#E9E9E9
| 325250 ||  || — || April 8, 2008 || Kitt Peak || Spacewatch || — || align=right | 1.2 km || 
|-id=251 bgcolor=#E9E9E9
| 325251 ||  || — || April 1, 2008 || Mount Lemmon || Mount Lemmon Survey || — || align=right | 1.6 km || 
|-id=252 bgcolor=#E9E9E9
| 325252 ||  || — || April 6, 2008 || Mount Lemmon || Mount Lemmon Survey || — || align=right data-sort-value="0.80" | 800 m || 
|-id=253 bgcolor=#E9E9E9
| 325253 ||  || — || April 6, 2008 || Mount Lemmon || Mount Lemmon Survey || — || align=right | 2.4 km || 
|-id=254 bgcolor=#E9E9E9
| 325254 ||  || — || April 6, 2008 || Mount Lemmon || Mount Lemmon Survey || — || align=right | 1.6 km || 
|-id=255 bgcolor=#E9E9E9
| 325255 ||  || — || April 8, 2008 || Kitt Peak || Spacewatch || — || align=right | 1.9 km || 
|-id=256 bgcolor=#E9E9E9
| 325256 ||  || — || April 8, 2008 || Kitt Peak || Spacewatch || — || align=right | 1.5 km || 
|-id=257 bgcolor=#E9E9E9
| 325257 ||  || — || April 8, 2008 || Kitt Peak || Spacewatch || — || align=right | 1.7 km || 
|-id=258 bgcolor=#E9E9E9
| 325258 ||  || — || April 9, 2008 || Kitt Peak || Spacewatch || ADE || align=right | 3.3 km || 
|-id=259 bgcolor=#E9E9E9
| 325259 ||  || — || April 9, 2008 || Kitt Peak || Spacewatch || — || align=right data-sort-value="0.79" | 790 m || 
|-id=260 bgcolor=#E9E9E9
| 325260 ||  || — || April 10, 2008 || Kitt Peak || Spacewatch || GEF || align=right | 1.4 km || 
|-id=261 bgcolor=#E9E9E9
| 325261 ||  || — || April 11, 2008 || Catalina || CSS || — || align=right | 2.3 km || 
|-id=262 bgcolor=#E9E9E9
| 325262 ||  || — || April 13, 2008 || Mount Lemmon || Mount Lemmon Survey || — || align=right | 1.7 km || 
|-id=263 bgcolor=#E9E9E9
| 325263 ||  || — || April 13, 2008 || Calvin-Rehoboth || Calvin–Rehoboth Obs. || — || align=right | 2.1 km || 
|-id=264 bgcolor=#E9E9E9
| 325264 ||  || — || April 13, 2008 || Mount Lemmon || Mount Lemmon Survey || — || align=right data-sort-value="0.96" | 960 m || 
|-id=265 bgcolor=#E9E9E9
| 325265 ||  || — || March 4, 2008 || Kitt Peak || Spacewatch || — || align=right data-sort-value="0.99" | 990 m || 
|-id=266 bgcolor=#E9E9E9
| 325266 ||  || — || April 11, 2008 || Kitt Peak || Spacewatch || — || align=right | 2.1 km || 
|-id=267 bgcolor=#E9E9E9
| 325267 ||  || — || April 11, 2008 || Kitt Peak || Spacewatch || — || align=right | 1.0 km || 
|-id=268 bgcolor=#E9E9E9
| 325268 ||  || — || April 3, 2008 || Kitt Peak || Spacewatch || — || align=right | 2.4 km || 
|-id=269 bgcolor=#E9E9E9
| 325269 ||  || — || March 30, 2008 || Kitt Peak || Spacewatch || — || align=right | 1.6 km || 
|-id=270 bgcolor=#E9E9E9
| 325270 ||  || — || November 22, 2006 || Mount Lemmon || Mount Lemmon Survey || — || align=right | 1.5 km || 
|-id=271 bgcolor=#E9E9E9
| 325271 ||  || — || April 12, 2008 || Mount Lemmon || Mount Lemmon Survey || — || align=right | 1.4 km || 
|-id=272 bgcolor=#E9E9E9
| 325272 ||  || — || April 13, 2008 || Kitt Peak || Spacewatch || — || align=right | 2.7 km || 
|-id=273 bgcolor=#E9E9E9
| 325273 ||  || — || April 9, 2008 || Catalina || CSS || BAR || align=right | 1.5 km || 
|-id=274 bgcolor=#E9E9E9
| 325274 ||  || — || April 4, 2008 || Mount Lemmon || Mount Lemmon Survey || KON || align=right | 2.3 km || 
|-id=275 bgcolor=#E9E9E9
| 325275 ||  || — || April 7, 2008 || Kitt Peak || Spacewatch || — || align=right | 1.1 km || 
|-id=276 bgcolor=#E9E9E9
| 325276 ||  || — || April 7, 2008 || Catalina || CSS || — || align=right | 1.6 km || 
|-id=277 bgcolor=#E9E9E9
| 325277 ||  || — || April 7, 2008 || Kitt Peak || Spacewatch || — || align=right | 1.2 km || 
|-id=278 bgcolor=#E9E9E9
| 325278 ||  || — || April 14, 2008 || Kitt Peak || Spacewatch || — || align=right | 1.6 km || 
|-id=279 bgcolor=#E9E9E9
| 325279 ||  || — || April 15, 2008 || Mount Lemmon || Mount Lemmon Survey || — || align=right | 2.3 km || 
|-id=280 bgcolor=#E9E9E9
| 325280 ||  || — || April 6, 2008 || Mount Lemmon || Mount Lemmon Survey || — || align=right | 2.9 km || 
|-id=281 bgcolor=#E9E9E9
| 325281 ||  || — || December 13, 2006 || Kitt Peak || Spacewatch || — || align=right | 1.4 km || 
|-id=282 bgcolor=#E9E9E9
| 325282 ||  || — || April 7, 2008 || Kitt Peak || Spacewatch || — || align=right | 1.4 km || 
|-id=283 bgcolor=#E9E9E9
| 325283 ||  || — || April 7, 2008 || Kitt Peak || Spacewatch || — || align=right | 2.2 km || 
|-id=284 bgcolor=#E9E9E9
| 325284 ||  || — || April 15, 2008 || Kitt Peak || Spacewatch || — || align=right | 1.8 km || 
|-id=285 bgcolor=#E9E9E9
| 325285 ||  || — || April 5, 2008 || Kitt Peak || Spacewatch || EUN || align=right | 1.6 km || 
|-id=286 bgcolor=#E9E9E9
| 325286 ||  || — || April 5, 2008 || Kitt Peak || Spacewatch || GEF || align=right | 1.4 km || 
|-id=287 bgcolor=#E9E9E9
| 325287 ||  || — || April 24, 2008 || Kitt Peak || Spacewatch || — || align=right | 1.0 km || 
|-id=288 bgcolor=#E9E9E9
| 325288 ||  || — || April 24, 2008 || Kitt Peak || Spacewatch || GEF || align=right | 1.6 km || 
|-id=289 bgcolor=#E9E9E9
| 325289 ||  || — || April 24, 2008 || Catalina || CSS || — || align=right | 1.7 km || 
|-id=290 bgcolor=#E9E9E9
| 325290 ||  || — || April 25, 2008 || Kitt Peak || Spacewatch || AER || align=right | 1.3 km || 
|-id=291 bgcolor=#E9E9E9
| 325291 ||  || — || April 25, 2008 || Kitt Peak || Spacewatch || — || align=right | 1.7 km || 
|-id=292 bgcolor=#E9E9E9
| 325292 ||  || — || April 25, 2008 || Kitt Peak || Spacewatch || — || align=right | 1.3 km || 
|-id=293 bgcolor=#E9E9E9
| 325293 ||  || — || April 25, 2008 || Mount Lemmon || Mount Lemmon Survey || — || align=right | 1.8 km || 
|-id=294 bgcolor=#E9E9E9
| 325294 ||  || — || April 27, 2008 || Kitt Peak || Spacewatch || — || align=right | 1.9 km || 
|-id=295 bgcolor=#E9E9E9
| 325295 ||  || — || April 28, 2008 || Kitt Peak || Spacewatch || — || align=right data-sort-value="0.81" | 810 m || 
|-id=296 bgcolor=#d6d6d6
| 325296 ||  || — || January 27, 2007 || Kitt Peak || Spacewatch || — || align=right | 2.6 km || 
|-id=297 bgcolor=#E9E9E9
| 325297 ||  || — || April 27, 2008 || Kitt Peak || Spacewatch || — || align=right | 1.4 km || 
|-id=298 bgcolor=#E9E9E9
| 325298 ||  || — || April 28, 2008 || Kitt Peak || Spacewatch || — || align=right | 2.3 km || 
|-id=299 bgcolor=#E9E9E9
| 325299 ||  || — || April 28, 2008 || Kitt Peak || Spacewatch || — || align=right | 1.5 km || 
|-id=300 bgcolor=#E9E9E9
| 325300 ||  || — || April 29, 2008 || Mount Lemmon || Mount Lemmon Survey || JUN || align=right | 1.1 km || 
|}

325301–325400 

|-bgcolor=#d6d6d6
| 325301 ||  || — || April 30, 2008 || Kitt Peak || Spacewatch || — || align=right | 3.6 km || 
|-id=302 bgcolor=#E9E9E9
| 325302 ||  || — || April 27, 2008 || Mount Lemmon || Mount Lemmon Survey || — || align=right | 1.2 km || 
|-id=303 bgcolor=#E9E9E9
| 325303 ||  || — || April 28, 2008 || Kitt Peak || Spacewatch || — || align=right | 1.9 km || 
|-id=304 bgcolor=#E9E9E9
| 325304 ||  || — || April 28, 2008 || Kitt Peak || Spacewatch || — || align=right | 2.2 km || 
|-id=305 bgcolor=#E9E9E9
| 325305 ||  || — || April 29, 2008 || Kitt Peak || Spacewatch || — || align=right | 1.7 km || 
|-id=306 bgcolor=#E9E9E9
| 325306 ||  || — || April 29, 2008 || Kitt Peak || Spacewatch || — || align=right | 2.4 km || 
|-id=307 bgcolor=#E9E9E9
| 325307 ||  || — || April 30, 2008 || Mount Lemmon || Mount Lemmon Survey || — || align=right | 1.6 km || 
|-id=308 bgcolor=#E9E9E9
| 325308 ||  || — || March 15, 2008 || Mount Lemmon || Mount Lemmon Survey || — || align=right | 1.7 km || 
|-id=309 bgcolor=#E9E9E9
| 325309 ||  || — || April 30, 2008 || Kitt Peak || Spacewatch || — || align=right | 2.6 km || 
|-id=310 bgcolor=#E9E9E9
| 325310 ||  || — || April 29, 2008 || Socorro || LINEAR || — || align=right | 2.6 km || 
|-id=311 bgcolor=#E9E9E9
| 325311 ||  || — || April 26, 2008 || Mount Lemmon || Mount Lemmon Survey || — || align=right | 1.2 km || 
|-id=312 bgcolor=#E9E9E9
| 325312 ||  || — || April 24, 2008 || Kitt Peak || Spacewatch || RAF || align=right | 1.4 km || 
|-id=313 bgcolor=#E9E9E9
| 325313 ||  || — || April 26, 2008 || Kitt Peak || Spacewatch || WIT || align=right | 1.1 km || 
|-id=314 bgcolor=#E9E9E9
| 325314 ||  || — || April 29, 2008 || Kitt Peak || Spacewatch || — || align=right | 1.6 km || 
|-id=315 bgcolor=#d6d6d6
| 325315 ||  || — || April 30, 2008 || Mount Lemmon || Mount Lemmon Survey || EOS || align=right | 2.5 km || 
|-id=316 bgcolor=#E9E9E9
| 325316 ||  || — || April 29, 2008 || Kitt Peak || Spacewatch || — || align=right | 1.3 km || 
|-id=317 bgcolor=#E9E9E9
| 325317 ||  || — || April 29, 2008 || Mount Lemmon || Mount Lemmon Survey || — || align=right | 1.7 km || 
|-id=318 bgcolor=#E9E9E9
| 325318 ||  || — || May 2, 2008 || Kitt Peak || Spacewatch || — || align=right | 2.2 km || 
|-id=319 bgcolor=#fefefe
| 325319 ||  || — || May 2, 2008 || Dauban || F. Kugel || V || align=right data-sort-value="0.80" | 800 m || 
|-id=320 bgcolor=#E9E9E9
| 325320 ||  || — || March 5, 2008 || Mount Lemmon || Mount Lemmon Survey || — || align=right | 2.2 km || 
|-id=321 bgcolor=#d6d6d6
| 325321 ||  || — || May 3, 2008 || Mount Lemmon || Mount Lemmon Survey || — || align=right | 2.8 km || 
|-id=322 bgcolor=#E9E9E9
| 325322 ||  || — || April 30, 2008 || Mount Lemmon || Mount Lemmon Survey || — || align=right | 3.1 km || 
|-id=323 bgcolor=#E9E9E9
| 325323 ||  || — || May 3, 2008 || Kitt Peak || Spacewatch || — || align=right | 2.0 km || 
|-id=324 bgcolor=#E9E9E9
| 325324 ||  || — || May 3, 2008 || Kitt Peak || Spacewatch || GEF || align=right | 1.2 km || 
|-id=325 bgcolor=#E9E9E9
| 325325 ||  || — || May 6, 2008 || Mount Lemmon || Mount Lemmon Survey || — || align=right | 2.0 km || 
|-id=326 bgcolor=#E9E9E9
| 325326 ||  || — || May 2, 2008 || Kitt Peak || Spacewatch || — || align=right | 2.7 km || 
|-id=327 bgcolor=#E9E9E9
| 325327 ||  || — || April 6, 2008 || Mount Lemmon || Mount Lemmon Survey || HNS || align=right | 1.2 km || 
|-id=328 bgcolor=#E9E9E9
| 325328 ||  || — || May 4, 2008 || Kitt Peak || Spacewatch || — || align=right | 2.1 km || 
|-id=329 bgcolor=#E9E9E9
| 325329 ||  || — || May 7, 2008 || Mount Lemmon || Mount Lemmon Survey || RAF || align=right data-sort-value="0.88" | 880 m || 
|-id=330 bgcolor=#E9E9E9
| 325330 ||  || — || May 7, 2008 || Uccle || T. Pauwels || — || align=right | 3.4 km || 
|-id=331 bgcolor=#E9E9E9
| 325331 ||  || — || May 8, 2008 || Kitt Peak || Spacewatch || — || align=right | 1.1 km || 
|-id=332 bgcolor=#E9E9E9
| 325332 ||  || — || April 26, 2008 || Mount Lemmon || Mount Lemmon Survey || NEM || align=right | 2.2 km || 
|-id=333 bgcolor=#E9E9E9
| 325333 ||  || — || May 11, 2008 || Kitt Peak || Spacewatch || — || align=right | 2.2 km || 
|-id=334 bgcolor=#E9E9E9
| 325334 ||  || — || May 3, 2008 || Kitt Peak || Spacewatch || — || align=right | 2.2 km || 
|-id=335 bgcolor=#E9E9E9
| 325335 ||  || — || May 5, 2008 || Kitt Peak || Spacewatch || — || align=right | 1.8 km || 
|-id=336 bgcolor=#E9E9E9
| 325336 ||  || — || May 14, 2008 || Mount Lemmon || Mount Lemmon Survey || — || align=right | 2.9 km || 
|-id=337 bgcolor=#E9E9E9
| 325337 ||  || — || May 15, 2008 || Kitt Peak || Spacewatch || — || align=right | 2.8 km || 
|-id=338 bgcolor=#E9E9E9
| 325338 ||  || — || May 6, 2008 || Mount Lemmon || Mount Lemmon Survey || MIS || align=right | 3.1 km || 
|-id=339 bgcolor=#E9E9E9
| 325339 ||  || — || May 3, 2008 || Mount Lemmon || Mount Lemmon Survey || — || align=right | 2.0 km || 
|-id=340 bgcolor=#E9E9E9
| 325340 ||  || — || May 26, 2008 || Kitt Peak || Spacewatch || — || align=right | 2.5 km || 
|-id=341 bgcolor=#E9E9E9
| 325341 ||  || — || May 26, 2008 || Kitt Peak || Spacewatch || — || align=right | 1.7 km || 
|-id=342 bgcolor=#E9E9E9
| 325342 ||  || — || May 27, 2008 || Kitt Peak || Spacewatch || — || align=right | 2.5 km || 
|-id=343 bgcolor=#E9E9E9
| 325343 ||  || — || May 27, 2008 || Kitt Peak || Spacewatch || — || align=right | 1.1 km || 
|-id=344 bgcolor=#E9E9E9
| 325344 ||  || — || May 27, 2008 || Kitt Peak || Spacewatch || HOF || align=right | 2.7 km || 
|-id=345 bgcolor=#E9E9E9
| 325345 ||  || — || May 28, 2008 || Kitt Peak || Spacewatch || — || align=right | 1.7 km || 
|-id=346 bgcolor=#d6d6d6
| 325346 ||  || — || May 29, 2008 || Mount Lemmon || Mount Lemmon Survey || BRA || align=right | 1.9 km || 
|-id=347 bgcolor=#E9E9E9
| 325347 ||  || — || May 27, 2008 || Kitt Peak || Spacewatch || — || align=right | 1.7 km || 
|-id=348 bgcolor=#d6d6d6
| 325348 ||  || — || May 27, 2008 || Kitt Peak || Spacewatch || — || align=right | 3.1 km || 
|-id=349 bgcolor=#E9E9E9
| 325349 ||  || — || May 28, 2008 || Kitt Peak || Spacewatch || NEM || align=right | 2.4 km || 
|-id=350 bgcolor=#E9E9E9
| 325350 ||  || — || May 28, 2008 || Kitt Peak || Spacewatch || AGN || align=right | 1.5 km || 
|-id=351 bgcolor=#E9E9E9
| 325351 ||  || — || May 29, 2008 || Kitt Peak || Spacewatch || — || align=right | 2.8 km || 
|-id=352 bgcolor=#E9E9E9
| 325352 ||  || — || May 29, 2008 || Mount Lemmon || Mount Lemmon Survey || — || align=right | 1.0 km || 
|-id=353 bgcolor=#E9E9E9
| 325353 ||  || — || May 30, 2008 || Kitt Peak || Spacewatch || — || align=right | 1.6 km || 
|-id=354 bgcolor=#E9E9E9
| 325354 ||  || — || May 31, 2008 || Kitt Peak || Spacewatch || — || align=right | 1.9 km || 
|-id=355 bgcolor=#d6d6d6
| 325355 ||  || — || June 3, 2008 || Kitt Peak || Spacewatch || — || align=right | 3.8 km || 
|-id=356 bgcolor=#E9E9E9
| 325356 ||  || — || June 7, 2008 || Kitt Peak || Spacewatch || — || align=right | 2.4 km || 
|-id=357 bgcolor=#d6d6d6
| 325357 ||  || — || June 9, 2008 || Bergisch Gladbach || W. Bickel || URS || align=right | 3.6 km || 
|-id=358 bgcolor=#E9E9E9
| 325358 ||  || — || June 7, 2008 || Kitt Peak || Spacewatch || — || align=right | 1.6 km || 
|-id=359 bgcolor=#E9E9E9
| 325359 ||  || — || June 24, 2008 || Siding Spring || SSS || — || align=right | 2.3 km || 
|-id=360 bgcolor=#d6d6d6
| 325360 ||  || — || June 30, 2008 || Kitt Peak || Spacewatch || — || align=right | 4.4 km || 
|-id=361 bgcolor=#d6d6d6
| 325361 ||  || — || July 3, 2008 || Siding Spring || SSS || — || align=right | 6.1 km || 
|-id=362 bgcolor=#d6d6d6
| 325362 ||  || — || July 29, 2008 || Kitt Peak || Spacewatch || — || align=right | 5.6 km || 
|-id=363 bgcolor=#d6d6d6
| 325363 ||  || — || August 1, 2008 || Dauban || F. Kugel || — || align=right | 3.2 km || 
|-id=364 bgcolor=#d6d6d6
| 325364 ||  || — || August 3, 2008 || Dauban || F. Kugel || — || align=right | 2.9 km || 
|-id=365 bgcolor=#d6d6d6
| 325365 ||  || — || July 30, 2008 || Catalina || CSS || TIR || align=right | 4.3 km || 
|-id=366 bgcolor=#d6d6d6
| 325366 Asturias ||  ||  || August 24, 2008 || La Cañada || J. Lacruz || — || align=right | 4.1 km || 
|-id=367 bgcolor=#d6d6d6
| 325367 ||  || — || August 26, 2008 || Socorro || LINEAR || — || align=right | 6.4 km || 
|-id=368 bgcolor=#d6d6d6
| 325368 Ihorhuk ||  ||  || August 25, 2008 || Andrushivka || Andrushivka Obs. || — || align=right | 3.0 km || 
|-id=369 bgcolor=#d6d6d6
| 325369 Shishilov ||  ||  || August 29, 2008 || Zelenchukskaya || Zelenchukskaya Stn. || VER || align=right | 3.5 km || 
|-id=370 bgcolor=#d6d6d6
| 325370 ||  || — || August 24, 2008 || Kitt Peak || Spacewatch || — || align=right | 3.6 km || 
|-id=371 bgcolor=#d6d6d6
| 325371 ||  || — || August 30, 2008 || Socorro || LINEAR || — || align=right | 4.3 km || 
|-id=372 bgcolor=#d6d6d6
| 325372 ||  || — || September 5, 2008 || Andrushivka || Andrushivka Obs. || TIR || align=right | 3.7 km || 
|-id=373 bgcolor=#d6d6d6
| 325373 ||  || — || September 2, 2008 || Kitt Peak || Spacewatch || HYG || align=right | 3.2 km || 
|-id=374 bgcolor=#C2FFFF
| 325374 ||  || — || September 5, 2008 || Kitt Peak || Spacewatch || L4HEK || align=right | 11 km || 
|-id=375 bgcolor=#d6d6d6
| 325375 ||  || — || September 7, 2008 || Catalina || CSS || — || align=right | 3.0 km || 
|-id=376 bgcolor=#d6d6d6
| 325376 ||  || — || September 22, 2008 || Socorro || LINEAR || — || align=right | 3.4 km || 
|-id=377 bgcolor=#d6d6d6
| 325377 ||  || — || September 20, 2008 || Kitt Peak || Spacewatch || 7:4 || align=right | 3.5 km || 
|-id=378 bgcolor=#d6d6d6
| 325378 ||  || — || September 21, 2008 || Kitt Peak || Spacewatch || — || align=right | 6.2 km || 
|-id=379 bgcolor=#d6d6d6
| 325379 ||  || — || September 22, 2008 || Mount Lemmon || Mount Lemmon Survey || TIR || align=right | 4.0 km || 
|-id=380 bgcolor=#d6d6d6
| 325380 ||  || — || September 28, 2008 || Goodricke-Pigott || R. A. Tucker || EUP || align=right | 5.4 km || 
|-id=381 bgcolor=#d6d6d6
| 325381 ||  || — || September 24, 2008 || Kitt Peak || Spacewatch || TIR || align=right | 3.7 km || 
|-id=382 bgcolor=#d6d6d6
| 325382 ||  || — || September 28, 2008 || Mount Lemmon || Mount Lemmon Survey || — || align=right | 2.8 km || 
|-id=383 bgcolor=#d6d6d6
| 325383 ||  || — || September 24, 2008 || Kitt Peak || Spacewatch || — || align=right | 3.4 km || 
|-id=384 bgcolor=#d6d6d6
| 325384 ||  || — || September 24, 2008 || Kitt Peak || Spacewatch || EUP || align=right | 4.0 km || 
|-id=385 bgcolor=#d6d6d6
| 325385 ||  || — || September 23, 2008 || Mount Lemmon || Mount Lemmon Survey || HIL3:2 || align=right | 6.2 km || 
|-id=386 bgcolor=#d6d6d6
| 325386 ||  || — || September 23, 2008 || Socorro || LINEAR || LUT || align=right | 7.3 km || 
|-id=387 bgcolor=#d6d6d6
| 325387 ||  || — || October 1, 2008 || Mount Lemmon || Mount Lemmon Survey || — || align=right | 3.8 km || 
|-id=388 bgcolor=#d6d6d6
| 325388 ||  || — || October 6, 2008 || Mount Lemmon || Mount Lemmon Survey || — || align=right | 4.7 km || 
|-id=389 bgcolor=#d6d6d6
| 325389 ||  || — || October 8, 2008 || Kitt Peak || Spacewatch || LIX || align=right | 4.4 km || 
|-id=390 bgcolor=#d6d6d6
| 325390 ||  || — || October 21, 2008 || Mount Lemmon || Mount Lemmon Survey || — || align=right | 4.4 km || 
|-id=391 bgcolor=#d6d6d6
| 325391 ||  || — || October 27, 2008 || Catalina || CSS || — || align=right | 4.8 km || 
|-id=392 bgcolor=#fefefe
| 325392 ||  || — || November 2, 2008 || Kitt Peak || Spacewatch || H || align=right data-sort-value="0.81" | 810 m || 
|-id=393 bgcolor=#fefefe
| 325393 ||  || — || November 17, 2008 || Kitt Peak || Spacewatch || H || align=right data-sort-value="0.83" | 830 m || 
|-id=394 bgcolor=#fefefe
| 325394 ||  || — || December 30, 2008 || Mount Lemmon || Mount Lemmon Survey || H || align=right data-sort-value="0.62" | 620 m || 
|-id=395 bgcolor=#FFC2E0
| 325395 ||  || — || February 14, 2009 || Catalina || CSS || ATE +1kmPHA || align=right | 1.1 km || 
|-id=396 bgcolor=#fefefe
| 325396 ||  || — || February 27, 2009 || Kitt Peak || Spacewatch || — || align=right data-sort-value="0.62" | 620 m || 
|-id=397 bgcolor=#fefefe
| 325397 ||  || — || February 20, 2009 || Kitt Peak || Spacewatch || — || align=right data-sort-value="0.71" | 710 m || 
|-id=398 bgcolor=#fefefe
| 325398 ||  || — || March 15, 2009 || Kitt Peak || Spacewatch || FLO || align=right data-sort-value="0.61" | 610 m || 
|-id=399 bgcolor=#fefefe
| 325399 ||  || — || March 2, 2009 || Mount Lemmon || Mount Lemmon Survey || — || align=right data-sort-value="0.69" | 690 m || 
|-id=400 bgcolor=#fefefe
| 325400 ||  || — || March 2, 2009 || Mount Lemmon || Mount Lemmon Survey || — || align=right | 1.00 km || 
|}

325401–325500 

|-bgcolor=#fefefe
| 325401 ||  || — || March 17, 2009 || Kitt Peak || Spacewatch || — || align=right data-sort-value="0.80" | 800 m || 
|-id=402 bgcolor=#fefefe
| 325402 ||  || — || March 18, 2009 || Kitt Peak || Spacewatch || FLO || align=right data-sort-value="0.64" | 640 m || 
|-id=403 bgcolor=#fefefe
| 325403 ||  || — || April 17, 2009 || Kitt Peak || Spacewatch || FLO || align=right data-sort-value="0.67" | 670 m || 
|-id=404 bgcolor=#fefefe
| 325404 ||  || — || April 18, 2009 || Kitt Peak || Spacewatch || FLO || align=right data-sort-value="0.67" | 670 m || 
|-id=405 bgcolor=#fefefe
| 325405 ||  || — || April 27, 2009 || Mount Lemmon || Mount Lemmon Survey || H || align=right data-sort-value="0.71" | 710 m || 
|-id=406 bgcolor=#fefefe
| 325406 ||  || — || April 29, 2009 || Kitt Peak || Spacewatch || — || align=right data-sort-value="0.93" | 930 m || 
|-id=407 bgcolor=#fefefe
| 325407 ||  || — || April 29, 2009 || Kitt Peak || Spacewatch || V || align=right data-sort-value="0.74" | 740 m || 
|-id=408 bgcolor=#fefefe
| 325408 ||  || — || April 27, 2009 || Kitt Peak || Spacewatch || — || align=right data-sort-value="0.93" | 930 m || 
|-id=409 bgcolor=#fefefe
| 325409 ||  || — || May 13, 2009 || Catalina || CSS || — || align=right data-sort-value="0.98" | 980 m || 
|-id=410 bgcolor=#fefefe
| 325410 ||  || — || May 14, 2009 || Kitt Peak || Spacewatch || — || align=right data-sort-value="0.83" | 830 m || 
|-id=411 bgcolor=#fefefe
| 325411 ||  || — || May 17, 2009 || La Sagra || OAM Obs. || — || align=right data-sort-value="0.91" | 910 m || 
|-id=412 bgcolor=#fefefe
| 325412 ||  || — || May 24, 2009 || Catalina || CSS || — || align=right data-sort-value="0.89" | 890 m || 
|-id=413 bgcolor=#fefefe
| 325413 ||  || — || May 24, 2009 || Catalina || CSS || — || align=right data-sort-value="0.77" | 770 m || 
|-id=414 bgcolor=#fefefe
| 325414 ||  || — || August 15, 2006 || Palomar || NEAT || — || align=right data-sort-value="0.83" | 830 m || 
|-id=415 bgcolor=#fefefe
| 325415 ||  || — || May 27, 2009 || Mount Lemmon || Mount Lemmon Survey || NYS || align=right data-sort-value="0.74" | 740 m || 
|-id=416 bgcolor=#fefefe
| 325416 ||  || — || May 28, 2009 || Mount Lemmon || Mount Lemmon Survey || FLO || align=right data-sort-value="0.56" | 560 m || 
|-id=417 bgcolor=#fefefe
| 325417 ||  || — || May 16, 2009 || Kitt Peak || Spacewatch || — || align=right data-sort-value="0.94" | 940 m || 
|-id=418 bgcolor=#fefefe
| 325418 ||  || — || May 20, 2009 || Socorro || LINEAR || — || align=right | 1.0 km || 
|-id=419 bgcolor=#fefefe
| 325419 ||  || — || May 16, 2009 || Mount Lemmon || Mount Lemmon Survey || FLO || align=right data-sort-value="0.75" | 750 m || 
|-id=420 bgcolor=#fefefe
| 325420 ||  || — || March 11, 2005 || Mount Lemmon || Mount Lemmon Survey || NYS || align=right data-sort-value="0.68" | 680 m || 
|-id=421 bgcolor=#fefefe
| 325421 || 2009 NF || — || July 1, 2009 || Hibiscus || N. Teamo || — || align=right | 1.3 km || 
|-id=422 bgcolor=#fefefe
| 325422 ||  || — || July 15, 2009 || La Sagra || OAM Obs. || — || align=right | 1.1 km || 
|-id=423 bgcolor=#fefefe
| 325423 ||  || — || July 20, 2009 || Sierra Stars || R. Matson || — || align=right | 1.0 km || 
|-id=424 bgcolor=#E9E9E9
| 325424 ||  || — || July 22, 2009 || Hibiscus || N. Teamo || — || align=right | 2.0 km || 
|-id=425 bgcolor=#fefefe
| 325425 ||  || — || July 17, 2009 || La Sagra || OAM Obs. || NYS || align=right data-sort-value="0.88" | 880 m || 
|-id=426 bgcolor=#E9E9E9
| 325426 ||  || — || July 28, 2009 || La Sagra || OAM Obs. || EUN || align=right | 1.2 km || 
|-id=427 bgcolor=#d6d6d6
| 325427 ||  || — || July 28, 2009 || La Sagra || OAM Obs. || — || align=right | 4.3 km || 
|-id=428 bgcolor=#E9E9E9
| 325428 ||  || — || July 27, 2009 || Kitt Peak || Spacewatch || — || align=right | 1.4 km || 
|-id=429 bgcolor=#d6d6d6
| 325429 ||  || — || July 30, 2009 || Kitt Peak || Spacewatch || — || align=right | 3.1 km || 
|-id=430 bgcolor=#fefefe
| 325430 ||  || — || July 28, 2009 || Kitt Peak || Spacewatch || — || align=right data-sort-value="0.98" | 980 m || 
|-id=431 bgcolor=#fefefe
| 325431 ||  || — || July 28, 2009 || Kitt Peak || Spacewatch || NYS || align=right data-sort-value="0.73" | 730 m || 
|-id=432 bgcolor=#fefefe
| 325432 ||  || — || July 28, 2009 || Kitt Peak || Spacewatch || MAS || align=right data-sort-value="0.85" | 850 m || 
|-id=433 bgcolor=#E9E9E9
| 325433 ||  || — || July 30, 2009 || Calvin-Rehoboth || Calvin–Rehoboth Obs. || — || align=right | 1.0 km || 
|-id=434 bgcolor=#fefefe
| 325434 ||  || — || July 25, 2009 || La Sagra || OAM Obs. || — || align=right | 1.00 km || 
|-id=435 bgcolor=#E9E9E9
| 325435 ||  || — || July 26, 2009 || Bergisch Gladbac || W. Bickel || KON || align=right | 2.5 km || 
|-id=436 bgcolor=#d6d6d6
| 325436 Khlebov ||  ||  || July 26, 2009 || Zelenchukskaya || T. V. Kryachko || — || align=right | 4.3 km || 
|-id=437 bgcolor=#E9E9E9
| 325437 ||  || — || August 15, 2009 || Kitt Peak || Spacewatch || AGN || align=right | 1.4 km || 
|-id=438 bgcolor=#E9E9E9
| 325438 ||  || — || August 15, 2009 || Kitt Peak || Spacewatch || — || align=right | 2.5 km || 
|-id=439 bgcolor=#d6d6d6
| 325439 ||  || — || August 15, 2009 || Kitt Peak || Spacewatch || — || align=right | 3.1 km || 
|-id=440 bgcolor=#E9E9E9
| 325440 ||  || — || August 15, 2009 || Kitt Peak || Spacewatch || — || align=right | 2.7 km || 
|-id=441 bgcolor=#d6d6d6
| 325441 ||  || — || August 16, 2009 || Altschwendt || W. Ries || BRA || align=right | 1.9 km || 
|-id=442 bgcolor=#E9E9E9
| 325442 ||  || — || August 17, 2009 || Vicques || M. Ory || DOR || align=right | 3.6 km || 
|-id=443 bgcolor=#d6d6d6
| 325443 ||  || — || August 16, 2009 || Catalina || CSS || — || align=right | 2.8 km || 
|-id=444 bgcolor=#d6d6d6
| 325444 ||  || — || August 17, 2009 || Hibiscus || N. Teamo || — || align=right | 3.6 km || 
|-id=445 bgcolor=#E9E9E9
| 325445 ||  || — || August 18, 2009 || La Sagra || OAM Obs. || TIN || align=right | 1.9 km || 
|-id=446 bgcolor=#d6d6d6
| 325446 ||  || — || August 16, 2009 || Kitt Peak || Spacewatch || — || align=right | 3.5 km || 
|-id=447 bgcolor=#E9E9E9
| 325447 ||  || — || August 16, 2009 || Kitt Peak || Spacewatch || — || align=right | 2.1 km || 
|-id=448 bgcolor=#d6d6d6
| 325448 ||  || — || August 16, 2009 || Kitt Peak || Spacewatch || — || align=right | 2.5 km || 
|-id=449 bgcolor=#d6d6d6
| 325449 ||  || — || August 16, 2009 || Kitt Peak || Spacewatch || CHA || align=right | 2.0 km || 
|-id=450 bgcolor=#E9E9E9
| 325450 ||  || — || August 16, 2009 || Kitt Peak || Spacewatch || — || align=right | 2.0 km || 
|-id=451 bgcolor=#E9E9E9
| 325451 ||  || — || August 16, 2009 || Kitt Peak || Spacewatch || — || align=right | 2.6 km || 
|-id=452 bgcolor=#d6d6d6
| 325452 ||  || — || August 17, 2009 || Kitt Peak || Spacewatch || ALA || align=right | 4.0 km || 
|-id=453 bgcolor=#E9E9E9
| 325453 ||  || — || August 19, 2009 || La Sagra || OAM Obs. || — || align=right | 2.2 km || 
|-id=454 bgcolor=#d6d6d6
| 325454 ||  || — || August 17, 2009 || La Sagra || OAM Obs. || — || align=right | 3.2 km || 
|-id=455 bgcolor=#d6d6d6
| 325455 Della Valle ||  ||  || August 20, 2009 || Magasa || M. Tonincelli, W. Marinello || — || align=right | 2.9 km || 
|-id=456 bgcolor=#E9E9E9
| 325456 ||  || — || August 17, 2009 || La Sagra || OAM Obs. || — || align=right | 1.8 km || 
|-id=457 bgcolor=#d6d6d6
| 325457 ||  || — || August 23, 2009 || Taunus || S. Karge, R. Kling || HYG || align=right | 3.2 km || 
|-id=458 bgcolor=#d6d6d6
| 325458 ||  || — || August 27, 2009 || La Sagra || OAM Obs. || — || align=right | 4.3 km || 
|-id=459 bgcolor=#d6d6d6
| 325459 ||  || — || August 20, 2009 || Kitt Peak || Spacewatch || — || align=right | 2.6 km || 
|-id=460 bgcolor=#d6d6d6
| 325460 ||  || — || August 27, 2009 || Catalina || CSS || HYG || align=right | 3.1 km || 
|-id=461 bgcolor=#fefefe
| 325461 ||  || — || August 27, 2009 || La Sagra || OAM Obs. || NYS || align=right | 1.0 km || 
|-id=462 bgcolor=#d6d6d6
| 325462 ||  || — || August 28, 2009 || La Sagra || OAM Obs. || EOS || align=right | 2.5 km || 
|-id=463 bgcolor=#E9E9E9
| 325463 ||  || — || August 28, 2009 || Kitt Peak || Spacewatch || — || align=right | 3.8 km || 
|-id=464 bgcolor=#E9E9E9
| 325464 ||  || — || October 22, 2005 || Kitt Peak || Spacewatch || — || align=right | 2.6 km || 
|-id=465 bgcolor=#fefefe
| 325465 ||  || — || August 16, 2009 || Kitt Peak || Spacewatch || NYS || align=right data-sort-value="0.75" | 750 m || 
|-id=466 bgcolor=#fefefe
| 325466 ||  || — || August 16, 2009 || Kitt Peak || Spacewatch || NYS || align=right data-sort-value="0.89" | 890 m || 
|-id=467 bgcolor=#d6d6d6
| 325467 ||  || — || August 27, 2009 || Kitt Peak || Spacewatch || — || align=right | 2.6 km || 
|-id=468 bgcolor=#fefefe
| 325468 ||  || — || August 16, 2009 || Kitt Peak || Spacewatch || NYS || align=right data-sort-value="0.74" | 740 m || 
|-id=469 bgcolor=#d6d6d6
| 325469 ||  || — || August 16, 2009 || Kitt Peak || Spacewatch || — || align=right | 3.7 km || 
|-id=470 bgcolor=#E9E9E9
| 325470 ||  || — || August 27, 2009 || Kitt Peak || Spacewatch || NEM || align=right | 2.5 km || 
|-id=471 bgcolor=#E9E9E9
| 325471 ||  || — || August 21, 2009 || Socorro || LINEAR || JUN || align=right | 1.4 km || 
|-id=472 bgcolor=#d6d6d6
| 325472 ||  || — || August 16, 2009 || Kitt Peak || Spacewatch || EOS || align=right | 2.1 km || 
|-id=473 bgcolor=#E9E9E9
| 325473 ||  || — || August 22, 2009 || Socorro || LINEAR || — || align=right | 2.1 km || 
|-id=474 bgcolor=#d6d6d6
| 325474 ||  || — || August 16, 2009 || Kitt Peak || Spacewatch || KAR || align=right | 1.1 km || 
|-id=475 bgcolor=#fefefe
| 325475 ||  || — || August 18, 2009 || Kitt Peak || Spacewatch || — || align=right data-sort-value="0.89" | 890 m || 
|-id=476 bgcolor=#E9E9E9
| 325476 ||  || — || September 10, 2009 || ESA OGS || ESA OGS || — || align=right | 2.4 km || 
|-id=477 bgcolor=#fefefe
| 325477 ||  || — || September 11, 2009 || La Sagra || OAM Obs. || — || align=right | 1.2 km || 
|-id=478 bgcolor=#d6d6d6
| 325478 ||  || — || September 10, 2009 || La Sagra || OAM Obs. || — || align=right | 4.4 km || 
|-id=479 bgcolor=#E9E9E9
| 325479 ||  || — || September 12, 2009 || Socorro || LINEAR || JUN || align=right | 2.1 km || 
|-id=480 bgcolor=#E9E9E9
| 325480 ||  || — || September 11, 2009 || Piszkéstető || K. Sárneczky || MAR || align=right | 1.5 km || 
|-id=481 bgcolor=#d6d6d6
| 325481 ||  || — || August 19, 2009 || Kitt Peak || Spacewatch || EOS || align=right | 2.7 km || 
|-id=482 bgcolor=#d6d6d6
| 325482 ||  || — || September 15, 2009 || Bisei SG Center || BATTeRS || — || align=right | 3.6 km || 
|-id=483 bgcolor=#d6d6d6
| 325483 ||  || — || September 12, 2009 || Kitt Peak || Spacewatch || — || align=right | 2.9 km || 
|-id=484 bgcolor=#d6d6d6
| 325484 ||  || — || September 12, 2009 || Kitt Peak || Spacewatch || — || align=right | 3.1 km || 
|-id=485 bgcolor=#d6d6d6
| 325485 ||  || — || September 12, 2009 || Kitt Peak || Spacewatch || KOR || align=right | 1.5 km || 
|-id=486 bgcolor=#d6d6d6
| 325486 ||  || — || September 12, 2009 || Kitt Peak || Spacewatch || HYG || align=right | 3.1 km || 
|-id=487 bgcolor=#fefefe
| 325487 ||  || — || September 12, 2009 || Kitt Peak || Spacewatch || — || align=right data-sort-value="0.82" | 820 m || 
|-id=488 bgcolor=#d6d6d6
| 325488 ||  || — || September 12, 2009 || Kitt Peak || Spacewatch || — || align=right | 3.1 km || 
|-id=489 bgcolor=#E9E9E9
| 325489 ||  || — || September 12, 2009 || Kitt Peak || Spacewatch || — || align=right | 2.7 km || 
|-id=490 bgcolor=#E9E9E9
| 325490 ||  || — || September 12, 2009 || Kitt Peak || Spacewatch || — || align=right | 2.0 km || 
|-id=491 bgcolor=#d6d6d6
| 325491 ||  || — || September 12, 2009 || Kitt Peak || Spacewatch || — || align=right | 5.0 km || 
|-id=492 bgcolor=#E9E9E9
| 325492 ||  || — || September 12, 2009 || Kitt Peak || Spacewatch || — || align=right | 2.0 km || 
|-id=493 bgcolor=#fefefe
| 325493 ||  || — || September 12, 2009 || Kitt Peak || Spacewatch || — || align=right data-sort-value="0.89" | 890 m || 
|-id=494 bgcolor=#E9E9E9
| 325494 ||  || — || September 12, 2009 || Kitt Peak || Spacewatch || — || align=right | 1.4 km || 
|-id=495 bgcolor=#d6d6d6
| 325495 ||  || — || September 13, 2009 || Purple Mountain || PMO NEO || — || align=right | 4.3 km || 
|-id=496 bgcolor=#E9E9E9
| 325496 ||  || — || September 14, 2009 || La Sagra || OAM Obs. || GEF || align=right | 1.7 km || 
|-id=497 bgcolor=#E9E9E9
| 325497 ||  || — || September 15, 2009 || Kitt Peak || Spacewatch || HOF || align=right | 3.6 km || 
|-id=498 bgcolor=#E9E9E9
| 325498 ||  || — || September 12, 2009 || Kitt Peak || Spacewatch || HNA || align=right | 2.5 km || 
|-id=499 bgcolor=#E9E9E9
| 325499 ||  || — || September 14, 2009 || Kitt Peak || Spacewatch || — || align=right | 3.0 km || 
|-id=500 bgcolor=#d6d6d6
| 325500 ||  || — || September 14, 2009 || Kitt Peak || Spacewatch || EOS || align=right | 2.3 km || 
|}

325501–325600 

|-bgcolor=#d6d6d6
| 325501 ||  || — || September 14, 2009 || Kitt Peak || Spacewatch || URS || align=right | 4.4 km || 
|-id=502 bgcolor=#d6d6d6
| 325502 ||  || — || September 15, 2009 || Kitt Peak || Spacewatch || EMA || align=right | 3.8 km || 
|-id=503 bgcolor=#d6d6d6
| 325503 ||  || — || September 15, 2009 || Kitt Peak || Spacewatch || — || align=right | 3.3 km || 
|-id=504 bgcolor=#fefefe
| 325504 ||  || — || September 15, 2009 || Kitt Peak || Spacewatch || — || align=right data-sort-value="0.98" | 980 m || 
|-id=505 bgcolor=#d6d6d6
| 325505 ||  || — || September 15, 2009 || Kitt Peak || Spacewatch || — || align=right | 5.7 km || 
|-id=506 bgcolor=#d6d6d6
| 325506 ||  || — || September 15, 2009 || Kitt Peak || Spacewatch || ELF || align=right | 4.7 km || 
|-id=507 bgcolor=#d6d6d6
| 325507 ||  || — || September 15, 2009 || Kitt Peak || Spacewatch || — || align=right | 3.8 km || 
|-id=508 bgcolor=#E9E9E9
| 325508 ||  || — || September 15, 2009 || Kitt Peak || Spacewatch || — || align=right | 1.7 km || 
|-id=509 bgcolor=#d6d6d6
| 325509 ||  || — || September 15, 2009 || Kitt Peak || Spacewatch || HYG || align=right | 3.7 km || 
|-id=510 bgcolor=#d6d6d6
| 325510 ||  || — || September 15, 2009 || Kitt Peak || Spacewatch || EOS || align=right | 3.1 km || 
|-id=511 bgcolor=#d6d6d6
| 325511 ||  || — || September 15, 2009 || Kitt Peak || Spacewatch || — || align=right | 2.9 km || 
|-id=512 bgcolor=#d6d6d6
| 325512 ||  || — || September 15, 2009 || Kitt Peak || Spacewatch || ARM || align=right | 4.0 km || 
|-id=513 bgcolor=#d6d6d6
| 325513 ||  || — || September 15, 2009 || Kitt Peak || Spacewatch || — || align=right | 2.6 km || 
|-id=514 bgcolor=#d6d6d6
| 325514 ||  || — || September 15, 2009 || Kitt Peak || Spacewatch || — || align=right | 3.1 km || 
|-id=515 bgcolor=#d6d6d6
| 325515 ||  || — || September 10, 2009 || Catalina || CSS || — || align=right | 4.1 km || 
|-id=516 bgcolor=#E9E9E9
| 325516 ||  || — || September 11, 2009 || Catalina || CSS || MIT || align=right | 1.9 km || 
|-id=517 bgcolor=#E9E9E9
| 325517 ||  || — || January 9, 2002 || Kitt Peak || Spacewatch || — || align=right | 3.0 km || 
|-id=518 bgcolor=#E9E9E9
| 325518 ||  || — || September 14, 2009 || La Sagra || OAM Obs. || — || align=right | 2.6 km || 
|-id=519 bgcolor=#d6d6d6
| 325519 ||  || — || September 13, 2009 || Siding Spring || SSS || EUP || align=right | 5.0 km || 
|-id=520 bgcolor=#E9E9E9
| 325520 ||  || — || September 15, 2009 || Kitt Peak || Spacewatch || — || align=right | 1.7 km || 
|-id=521 bgcolor=#d6d6d6
| 325521 ||  || — || September 15, 2009 || Kitt Peak || Spacewatch || EOS || align=right | 2.2 km || 
|-id=522 bgcolor=#d6d6d6
| 325522 ||  || — || September 15, 2009 || Kitt Peak || Spacewatch || ALA || align=right | 3.9 km || 
|-id=523 bgcolor=#d6d6d6
| 325523 ||  || — || September 15, 2009 || Kitt Peak || Spacewatch || — || align=right | 3.4 km || 
|-id=524 bgcolor=#d6d6d6
| 325524 ||  || — || September 15, 2009 || Kitt Peak || Spacewatch || — || align=right | 3.2 km || 
|-id=525 bgcolor=#d6d6d6
| 325525 ||  || — || September 15, 2009 || Kitt Peak || Spacewatch || TIR || align=right | 3.3 km || 
|-id=526 bgcolor=#E9E9E9
| 325526 ||  || — || September 13, 2009 || Socorro || LINEAR || JUN || align=right | 1.3 km || 
|-id=527 bgcolor=#d6d6d6
| 325527 ||  || — || September 16, 2009 || Mount Lemmon || Mount Lemmon Survey || EOS || align=right | 1.9 km || 
|-id=528 bgcolor=#E9E9E9
| 325528 ||  || — || September 16, 2009 || Mount Lemmon || Mount Lemmon Survey || HEN || align=right | 1.1 km || 
|-id=529 bgcolor=#fefefe
| 325529 ||  || — || September 17, 2009 || Mount Lemmon || Mount Lemmon Survey || — || align=right data-sort-value="0.90" | 900 m || 
|-id=530 bgcolor=#d6d6d6
| 325530 ||  || — || September 23, 2009 || Mayhill || A. Lowe || EOS || align=right | 2.7 km || 
|-id=531 bgcolor=#fefefe
| 325531 ||  || — || September 18, 2009 || Mount Lemmon || Mount Lemmon Survey || — || align=right | 1.0 km || 
|-id=532 bgcolor=#d6d6d6
| 325532 ||  || — || September 18, 2009 || Mount Lemmon || Mount Lemmon Survey || TEL || align=right | 1.5 km || 
|-id=533 bgcolor=#E9E9E9
| 325533 ||  || — || September 16, 2009 || Kitt Peak || Spacewatch || — || align=right | 1.8 km || 
|-id=534 bgcolor=#d6d6d6
| 325534 ||  || — || September 16, 2009 || Kitt Peak || Spacewatch || — || align=right | 2.5 km || 
|-id=535 bgcolor=#d6d6d6
| 325535 ||  || — || September 16, 2009 || Mount Lemmon || Mount Lemmon Survey || CRO || align=right | 3.9 km || 
|-id=536 bgcolor=#d6d6d6
| 325536 ||  || — || September 16, 2009 || Kitt Peak || Spacewatch || — || align=right | 3.4 km || 
|-id=537 bgcolor=#E9E9E9
| 325537 ||  || — || September 17, 2009 || La Sagra || OAM Obs. || — || align=right | 2.4 km || 
|-id=538 bgcolor=#d6d6d6
| 325538 ||  || — || September 17, 2009 || Kitt Peak || Spacewatch || KOR || align=right | 1.3 km || 
|-id=539 bgcolor=#d6d6d6
| 325539 ||  || — || September 17, 2009 || Kitt Peak || Spacewatch || — || align=right | 4.2 km || 
|-id=540 bgcolor=#d6d6d6
| 325540 ||  || — || September 17, 2009 || Kitt Peak || Spacewatch || — || align=right | 3.4 km || 
|-id=541 bgcolor=#d6d6d6
| 325541 ||  || — || September 17, 2009 || Kitt Peak || Spacewatch || EOS || align=right | 2.2 km || 
|-id=542 bgcolor=#d6d6d6
| 325542 ||  || — || September 17, 2009 || Kitt Peak || Spacewatch || — || align=right | 2.9 km || 
|-id=543 bgcolor=#d6d6d6
| 325543 ||  || — || April 29, 2008 || Mount Lemmon || Mount Lemmon Survey || — || align=right | 2.8 km || 
|-id=544 bgcolor=#d6d6d6
| 325544 ||  || — || September 17, 2009 || Kitt Peak || Spacewatch || — || align=right | 4.9 km || 
|-id=545 bgcolor=#d6d6d6
| 325545 ||  || — || September 17, 2009 || Kitt Peak || Spacewatch || EOS || align=right | 3.3 km || 
|-id=546 bgcolor=#E9E9E9
| 325546 ||  || — || September 17, 2009 || Mount Lemmon || Mount Lemmon Survey || — || align=right | 1.9 km || 
|-id=547 bgcolor=#d6d6d6
| 325547 ||  || — || September 17, 2009 || Mount Lemmon || Mount Lemmon Survey || — || align=right | 3.5 km || 
|-id=548 bgcolor=#d6d6d6
| 325548 ||  || — || September 17, 2009 || Kitt Peak || Spacewatch || — || align=right | 2.6 km || 
|-id=549 bgcolor=#E9E9E9
| 325549 ||  || — || September 17, 2009 || Kitt Peak || Spacewatch || GEF || align=right | 1.5 km || 
|-id=550 bgcolor=#d6d6d6
| 325550 ||  || — || September 17, 2009 || Kitt Peak || Spacewatch || EOS || align=right | 2.2 km || 
|-id=551 bgcolor=#E9E9E9
| 325551 ||  || — || September 18, 2009 || Kitt Peak || Spacewatch || — || align=right | 1.9 km || 
|-id=552 bgcolor=#d6d6d6
| 325552 ||  || — || September 18, 2009 || Mount Lemmon || Mount Lemmon Survey || — || align=right | 2.5 km || 
|-id=553 bgcolor=#d6d6d6
| 325553 ||  || — || March 10, 2007 || Mount Lemmon || Mount Lemmon Survey || — || align=right | 2.2 km || 
|-id=554 bgcolor=#d6d6d6
| 325554 ||  || — || March 5, 2002 || Apache Point || SDSS || CHA || align=right | 1.9 km || 
|-id=555 bgcolor=#E9E9E9
| 325555 ||  || — || September 18, 2009 || Mount Lemmon || Mount Lemmon Survey || — || align=right | 1.9 km || 
|-id=556 bgcolor=#d6d6d6
| 325556 ||  || — || September 18, 2009 || Mount Lemmon || Mount Lemmon Survey || — || align=right | 4.1 km || 
|-id=557 bgcolor=#E9E9E9
| 325557 ||  || — || September 22, 2009 || Taunus || E. Schwab, R. Kling || WIT || align=right | 1.1 km || 
|-id=558 bgcolor=#d6d6d6
| 325558 Guyane ||  ||  || September 24, 2009 || Tzec Maun || E. Schwab || — || align=right | 5.0 km || 
|-id=559 bgcolor=#d6d6d6
| 325559 ||  || — || September 23, 2009 || Altschwendt || W. Ries || KOR || align=right | 1.6 km || 
|-id=560 bgcolor=#d6d6d6
| 325560 ||  || — || September 26, 2009 || Altschwendt || W. Ries || HYG || align=right | 3.4 km || 
|-id=561 bgcolor=#d6d6d6
| 325561 ||  || — || September 16, 2009 || Catalina || CSS || KOR || align=right | 1.9 km || 
|-id=562 bgcolor=#fefefe
| 325562 ||  || — || September 16, 2009 || Kitt Peak || Spacewatch || LCI || align=right | 1.1 km || 
|-id=563 bgcolor=#d6d6d6
| 325563 ||  || — || September 17, 2009 || Kitt Peak || Spacewatch || — || align=right | 6.0 km || 
|-id=564 bgcolor=#E9E9E9
| 325564 ||  || — || September 18, 2009 || Kitt Peak || Spacewatch || — || align=right | 2.4 km || 
|-id=565 bgcolor=#d6d6d6
| 325565 ||  || — || September 18, 2009 || Kitt Peak || Spacewatch || EOS || align=right | 2.7 km || 
|-id=566 bgcolor=#d6d6d6
| 325566 ||  || — || September 18, 2009 || Kitt Peak || Spacewatch || EMA || align=right | 3.3 km || 
|-id=567 bgcolor=#E9E9E9
| 325567 ||  || — || September 18, 2009 || Kitt Peak || Spacewatch || — || align=right | 2.4 km || 
|-id=568 bgcolor=#E9E9E9
| 325568 ||  || — || September 18, 2009 || Kitt Peak || Spacewatch || — || align=right | 1.1 km || 
|-id=569 bgcolor=#d6d6d6
| 325569 ||  || — || September 18, 2009 || Kitt Peak || Spacewatch || EOS || align=right | 2.6 km || 
|-id=570 bgcolor=#E9E9E9
| 325570 ||  || — || September 18, 2009 || Kitt Peak || Spacewatch || — || align=right | 3.3 km || 
|-id=571 bgcolor=#d6d6d6
| 325571 ||  || — || September 18, 2009 || Kitt Peak || Spacewatch || — || align=right | 4.0 km || 
|-id=572 bgcolor=#E9E9E9
| 325572 ||  || — || September 18, 2009 || Kitt Peak || Spacewatch || — || align=right | 1.3 km || 
|-id=573 bgcolor=#d6d6d6
| 325573 ||  || — || September 18, 2009 || Kitt Peak || Spacewatch || — || align=right | 3.0 km || 
|-id=574 bgcolor=#d6d6d6
| 325574 ||  || — || September 18, 2009 || Kitt Peak || Spacewatch || — || align=right | 4.0 km || 
|-id=575 bgcolor=#d6d6d6
| 325575 ||  || — || September 18, 2009 || Kitt Peak || Spacewatch || — || align=right | 2.3 km || 
|-id=576 bgcolor=#d6d6d6
| 325576 ||  || — || September 18, 2009 || Kitt Peak || Spacewatch || — || align=right | 2.5 km || 
|-id=577 bgcolor=#d6d6d6
| 325577 ||  || — || September 18, 2009 || Kitt Peak || Spacewatch || URS || align=right | 4.6 km || 
|-id=578 bgcolor=#d6d6d6
| 325578 ||  || — || September 18, 2009 || Kitt Peak || Spacewatch || — || align=right | 3.3 km || 
|-id=579 bgcolor=#d6d6d6
| 325579 ||  || — || September 18, 2009 || Kitt Peak || Spacewatch || — || align=right | 3.0 km || 
|-id=580 bgcolor=#E9E9E9
| 325580 ||  || — || September 18, 2009 || Kitt Peak || Spacewatch || JUN || align=right | 1.4 km || 
|-id=581 bgcolor=#d6d6d6
| 325581 ||  || — || September 18, 2009 || Kitt Peak || Spacewatch || — || align=right | 3.6 km || 
|-id=582 bgcolor=#d6d6d6
| 325582 ||  || — || September 18, 2009 || Purple Mountain || PMO NEO || — || align=right | 3.9 km || 
|-id=583 bgcolor=#d6d6d6
| 325583 ||  || — || September 19, 2009 || Kitt Peak || Spacewatch || — || align=right | 4.2 km || 
|-id=584 bgcolor=#d6d6d6
| 325584 ||  || — || September 19, 2009 || Kitt Peak || Spacewatch || TEL || align=right | 1.6 km || 
|-id=585 bgcolor=#d6d6d6
| 325585 ||  || — || September 19, 2009 || Catalina || CSS || — || align=right | 4.2 km || 
|-id=586 bgcolor=#E9E9E9
| 325586 ||  || — || March 27, 2003 || Kitt Peak || Spacewatch || — || align=right | 2.5 km || 
|-id=587 bgcolor=#fefefe
| 325587 ||  || — || September 19, 2009 || Mount Lemmon || Mount Lemmon Survey || NYS || align=right data-sort-value="0.79" | 790 m || 
|-id=588 bgcolor=#d6d6d6
| 325588 Bridzius ||  ||  || September 19, 2009 || Moletai || K. Černis, J. Zdanavičius || — || align=right | 4.0 km || 
|-id=589 bgcolor=#d6d6d6
| 325589 ||  || — || September 20, 2009 || Kitt Peak || Spacewatch || LIX || align=right | 5.5 km || 
|-id=590 bgcolor=#d6d6d6
| 325590 ||  || — || September 20, 2009 || Kitt Peak || Spacewatch || — || align=right | 2.2 km || 
|-id=591 bgcolor=#d6d6d6
| 325591 ||  || — || September 20, 2009 || Kitt Peak || Spacewatch || THM || align=right | 2.6 km || 
|-id=592 bgcolor=#E9E9E9
| 325592 ||  || — || September 20, 2009 || Kitt Peak || Spacewatch || — || align=right | 2.4 km || 
|-id=593 bgcolor=#d6d6d6
| 325593 ||  || — || September 20, 2009 || Mount Lemmon || Mount Lemmon Survey || EMA || align=right | 4.8 km || 
|-id=594 bgcolor=#d6d6d6
| 325594 ||  || — || September 20, 2009 || Kitt Peak || Spacewatch || — || align=right | 3.3 km || 
|-id=595 bgcolor=#E9E9E9
| 325595 ||  || — || September 20, 2009 || Kitt Peak || Spacewatch || 526 || align=right | 3.1 km || 
|-id=596 bgcolor=#d6d6d6
| 325596 ||  || — || September 20, 2009 || Kitt Peak || Spacewatch || — || align=right | 3.9 km || 
|-id=597 bgcolor=#d6d6d6
| 325597 ||  || — || September 11, 2004 || Kitt Peak || Spacewatch || NAE || align=right | 2.6 km || 
|-id=598 bgcolor=#d6d6d6
| 325598 ||  || — || September 17, 2003 || Kitt Peak || Spacewatch || URS || align=right | 5.8 km || 
|-id=599 bgcolor=#d6d6d6
| 325599 ||  || — || September 20, 2009 || Mount Lemmon || Mount Lemmon Survey || URS || align=right | 3.8 km || 
|-id=600 bgcolor=#E9E9E9
| 325600 ||  || — || September 21, 2009 || Kitt Peak || Spacewatch || MRX || align=right | 1.2 km || 
|}

325601–325700 

|-bgcolor=#d6d6d6
| 325601 ||  || — || September 21, 2009 || Kitt Peak || Spacewatch || EMA || align=right | 3.6 km || 
|-id=602 bgcolor=#d6d6d6
| 325602 ||  || — || September 22, 2009 || Kitt Peak || Spacewatch || — || align=right | 4.7 km || 
|-id=603 bgcolor=#d6d6d6
| 325603 ||  || — || September 22, 2009 || Kitt Peak || Spacewatch || — || align=right | 3.7 km || 
|-id=604 bgcolor=#d6d6d6
| 325604 ||  || — || September 22, 2009 || Kitt Peak || Spacewatch || 7:4 || align=right | 5.3 km || 
|-id=605 bgcolor=#d6d6d6
| 325605 ||  || — || September 23, 2009 || Kitt Peak || Spacewatch || — || align=right | 4.4 km || 
|-id=606 bgcolor=#E9E9E9
| 325606 ||  || — || September 23, 2009 || Catalina || CSS || — || align=right | 3.1 km || 
|-id=607 bgcolor=#d6d6d6
| 325607 ||  || — || September 23, 2009 || Kitt Peak || Spacewatch || EOS || align=right | 2.5 km || 
|-id=608 bgcolor=#d6d6d6
| 325608 ||  || — || September 24, 2009 || Kitt Peak || Spacewatch || EOS || align=right | 3.0 km || 
|-id=609 bgcolor=#E9E9E9
| 325609 ||  || — || September 24, 2009 || Kitt Peak || Spacewatch || — || align=right | 2.3 km || 
|-id=610 bgcolor=#E9E9E9
| 325610 ||  || — || November 25, 2005 || Kitt Peak || Spacewatch || — || align=right | 2.5 km || 
|-id=611 bgcolor=#d6d6d6
| 325611 ||  || — || September 16, 2009 || Catalina || CSS || — || align=right | 3.5 km || 
|-id=612 bgcolor=#E9E9E9
| 325612 ||  || — || September 19, 2009 || Kitt Peak || Spacewatch || RAF || align=right | 1.1 km || 
|-id=613 bgcolor=#d6d6d6
| 325613 ||  || — || March 27, 1996 || Kitt Peak || Spacewatch || EOS || align=right | 3.0 km || 
|-id=614 bgcolor=#d6d6d6
| 325614 ||  || — || September 19, 2009 || Catalina || CSS || — || align=right | 3.4 km || 
|-id=615 bgcolor=#d6d6d6
| 325615 ||  || — || September 16, 2009 || Catalina || CSS || — || align=right | 4.9 km || 
|-id=616 bgcolor=#E9E9E9
| 325616 ||  || — || September 16, 2009 || Kitt Peak || Spacewatch || — || align=right | 1.3 km || 
|-id=617 bgcolor=#d6d6d6
| 325617 ||  || — || September 16, 2009 || Catalina || CSS || — || align=right | 3.9 km || 
|-id=618 bgcolor=#d6d6d6
| 325618 ||  || — || September 17, 2009 || Catalina || CSS || TIR || align=right | 4.0 km || 
|-id=619 bgcolor=#E9E9E9
| 325619 ||  || — || September 17, 2009 || Catalina || CSS || — || align=right | 3.3 km || 
|-id=620 bgcolor=#FA8072
| 325620 ||  || — || September 29, 2009 || Skylive Obs. || F. Tozzi || — || align=right | 1.3 km || 
|-id=621 bgcolor=#E9E9E9
| 325621 ||  || — || February 26, 2007 || Mount Lemmon || Mount Lemmon Survey || — || align=right | 2.4 km || 
|-id=622 bgcolor=#E9E9E9
| 325622 ||  || — || September 20, 2009 || Kitt Peak || Spacewatch || — || align=right | 1.5 km || 
|-id=623 bgcolor=#d6d6d6
| 325623 ||  || — || September 21, 2009 || Mount Lemmon || Mount Lemmon Survey || — || align=right | 2.9 km || 
|-id=624 bgcolor=#E9E9E9
| 325624 ||  || — || September 23, 2009 || Mount Lemmon || Mount Lemmon Survey || — || align=right | 2.5 km || 
|-id=625 bgcolor=#d6d6d6
| 325625 ||  || — || September 23, 2009 || Mount Lemmon || Mount Lemmon Survey || — || align=right | 4.8 km || 
|-id=626 bgcolor=#E9E9E9
| 325626 ||  || — || September 24, 2009 || Kitt Peak || Spacewatch || AGN || align=right | 1.3 km || 
|-id=627 bgcolor=#d6d6d6
| 325627 ||  || — || September 24, 2009 || Mount Lemmon || Mount Lemmon Survey || — || align=right | 3.0 km || 
|-id=628 bgcolor=#d6d6d6
| 325628 ||  || — || September 25, 2009 || Kitt Peak || Spacewatch || HYG || align=right | 3.7 km || 
|-id=629 bgcolor=#E9E9E9
| 325629 ||  || — || September 25, 2009 || Kitt Peak || Spacewatch || — || align=right | 2.5 km || 
|-id=630 bgcolor=#d6d6d6
| 325630 ||  || — || September 25, 2009 || Kitt Peak || Spacewatch || — || align=right | 3.4 km || 
|-id=631 bgcolor=#d6d6d6
| 325631 ||  || — || September 25, 2009 || Kitt Peak || Spacewatch || — || align=right | 3.1 km || 
|-id=632 bgcolor=#d6d6d6
| 325632 ||  || — || September 25, 2009 || Kitt Peak || Spacewatch || 628 || align=right | 2.3 km || 
|-id=633 bgcolor=#E9E9E9
| 325633 ||  || — || September 25, 2009 || Kitt Peak || Spacewatch || — || align=right | 1.1 km || 
|-id=634 bgcolor=#d6d6d6
| 325634 ||  || — || September 25, 2009 || Kitt Peak || Spacewatch || — || align=right | 2.7 km || 
|-id=635 bgcolor=#d6d6d6
| 325635 ||  || — || September 25, 2009 || Kitt Peak || Spacewatch || — || align=right | 3.1 km || 
|-id=636 bgcolor=#d6d6d6
| 325636 ||  || — || September 28, 2009 || Kitt Peak || Spacewatch || — || align=right | 3.1 km || 
|-id=637 bgcolor=#d6d6d6
| 325637 ||  || — || September 28, 2009 || Mount Lemmon || Mount Lemmon Survey || — || align=right | 2.5 km || 
|-id=638 bgcolor=#d6d6d6
| 325638 ||  || — || September 29, 2009 || Mount Lemmon || Mount Lemmon Survey || EOS || align=right | 2.7 km || 
|-id=639 bgcolor=#d6d6d6
| 325639 ||  || — || September 17, 2009 || Kitt Peak || Spacewatch || — || align=right | 3.0 km || 
|-id=640 bgcolor=#E9E9E9
| 325640 ||  || — || September 17, 2009 || Kitt Peak || Spacewatch || — || align=right data-sort-value="0.83" | 830 m || 
|-id=641 bgcolor=#C2FFFF
| 325641 ||  || — || September 29, 2008 || Mount Lemmon || Mount Lemmon Survey || L4 || align=right | 8.7 km || 
|-id=642 bgcolor=#d6d6d6
| 325642 ||  || — || September 19, 2009 || Catalina || CSS || — || align=right | 3.6 km || 
|-id=643 bgcolor=#d6d6d6
| 325643 ||  || — || March 13, 2007 || Mount Lemmon || Mount Lemmon Survey || — || align=right | 3.1 km || 
|-id=644 bgcolor=#d6d6d6
| 325644 ||  || — || January 28, 2006 || Kitt Peak || Spacewatch || — || align=right | 2.6 km || 
|-id=645 bgcolor=#d6d6d6
| 325645 ||  || — || September 23, 2009 || Kitt Peak || Spacewatch || 3:2 || align=right | 4.9 km || 
|-id=646 bgcolor=#d6d6d6
| 325646 ||  || — || December 20, 2000 || Kitt Peak || Spacewatch || — || align=right | 3.2 km || 
|-id=647 bgcolor=#d6d6d6
| 325647 ||  || — || September 29, 2009 || Kitt Peak || Spacewatch || — || align=right | 2.6 km || 
|-id=648 bgcolor=#E9E9E9
| 325648 ||  || — || September 28, 2009 || Catalina || CSS || — || align=right | 3.0 km || 
|-id=649 bgcolor=#E9E9E9
| 325649 ||  || — || September 18, 2009 || Catalina || CSS || — || align=right | 3.8 km || 
|-id=650 bgcolor=#d6d6d6
| 325650 ||  || — || September 19, 2009 || Catalina || CSS || — || align=right | 3.9 km || 
|-id=651 bgcolor=#fefefe
| 325651 ||  || — || September 19, 2009 || Catalina || CSS || — || align=right | 1.3 km || 
|-id=652 bgcolor=#E9E9E9
| 325652 ||  || — || September 21, 2009 || Catalina || CSS || — || align=right | 1.2 km || 
|-id=653 bgcolor=#d6d6d6
| 325653 ||  || — || September 22, 2009 || Catalina || CSS || — || align=right | 4.7 km || 
|-id=654 bgcolor=#d6d6d6
| 325654 ||  || — || February 4, 2006 || Mount Lemmon || Mount Lemmon Survey || — || align=right | 2.4 km || 
|-id=655 bgcolor=#d6d6d6
| 325655 ||  || — || September 24, 2009 || Catalina || CSS || — || align=right | 4.2 km || 
|-id=656 bgcolor=#E9E9E9
| 325656 ||  || — || September 16, 2009 || Catalina || CSS || — || align=right | 1.3 km || 
|-id=657 bgcolor=#E9E9E9
| 325657 ||  || — || September 16, 2009 || Kitt Peak || Spacewatch || — || align=right | 2.8 km || 
|-id=658 bgcolor=#d6d6d6
| 325658 ||  || — || March 26, 2007 || Mount Lemmon || Mount Lemmon Survey || EOS || align=right | 2.6 km || 
|-id=659 bgcolor=#d6d6d6
| 325659 ||  || — || September 21, 2009 || Mount Lemmon || Mount Lemmon Survey || — || align=right | 4.1 km || 
|-id=660 bgcolor=#d6d6d6
| 325660 ||  || — || September 21, 2009 || Mount Lemmon || Mount Lemmon Survey || EOS || align=right | 2.0 km || 
|-id=661 bgcolor=#d6d6d6
| 325661 ||  || — || September 18, 2009 || Kitt Peak || Spacewatch || — || align=right | 4.7 km || 
|-id=662 bgcolor=#E9E9E9
| 325662 ||  || — || September 18, 2009 || Mount Lemmon || Mount Lemmon Survey || AGN || align=right | 1.2 km || 
|-id=663 bgcolor=#d6d6d6
| 325663 ||  || — || September 18, 2009 || Catalina || CSS || — || align=right | 3.3 km || 
|-id=664 bgcolor=#d6d6d6
| 325664 ||  || — || September 27, 2009 || Socorro || LINEAR || — || align=right | 5.5 km || 
|-id=665 bgcolor=#d6d6d6
| 325665 ||  || — || September 28, 2009 || Mount Lemmon || Mount Lemmon Survey || — || align=right | 3.9 km || 
|-id=666 bgcolor=#d6d6d6
| 325666 ||  || — || September 29, 2009 || Catalina || CSS || Tj (2.95) || align=right | 6.4 km || 
|-id=667 bgcolor=#d6d6d6
| 325667 ||  || — || September 22, 2009 || Kitt Peak || Spacewatch || — || align=right | 2.5 km || 
|-id=668 bgcolor=#d6d6d6
| 325668 ||  || — || September 28, 2009 || Mount Lemmon || Mount Lemmon Survey || — || align=right | 3.8 km || 
|-id=669 bgcolor=#d6d6d6
| 325669 ||  || — || October 1, 2009 || Kitt Peak || Spacewatch || EOS || align=right | 5.1 km || 
|-id=670 bgcolor=#E9E9E9
| 325670 ||  || — || October 10, 2009 || La Sagra || OAM Obs. || — || align=right | 3.6 km || 
|-id=671 bgcolor=#E9E9E9
| 325671 ||  || — || October 11, 2009 || Lake Tekapo || Mount John Obs. || — || align=right | 1.8 km || 
|-id=672 bgcolor=#d6d6d6
| 325672 ||  || — || September 22, 2009 || Kitt Peak || Spacewatch || — || align=right | 3.9 km || 
|-id=673 bgcolor=#E9E9E9
| 325673 ||  || — || October 11, 2009 || Mount Lemmon || Mount Lemmon Survey || INO || align=right | 2.1 km || 
|-id=674 bgcolor=#d6d6d6
| 325674 ||  || — || October 12, 2009 || La Sagra || OAM Obs. || — || align=right | 4.2 km || 
|-id=675 bgcolor=#d6d6d6
| 325675 ||  || — || October 12, 2009 || La Sagra || OAM Obs. || URS || align=right | 5.6 km || 
|-id=676 bgcolor=#E9E9E9
| 325676 ||  || — || October 15, 2009 || Bisei SG Center || BATTeRS || — || align=right | 2.7 km || 
|-id=677 bgcolor=#d6d6d6
| 325677 ||  || — || August 28, 2003 || Palomar || NEAT || — || align=right | 4.1 km || 
|-id=678 bgcolor=#d6d6d6
| 325678 ||  || — || October 2, 2009 || Mount Lemmon || Mount Lemmon Survey || — || align=right | 3.2 km || 
|-id=679 bgcolor=#C2FFFF
| 325679 ||  || — || October 1, 2009 || Mount Lemmon || Mount Lemmon Survey || L4 || align=right | 14 km || 
|-id=680 bgcolor=#d6d6d6
| 325680 ||  || — || October 9, 2009 || Catalina || CSS || — || align=right | 4.2 km || 
|-id=681 bgcolor=#d6d6d6
| 325681 ||  || — || October 13, 2009 || La Sagra || OAM Obs. || EOS || align=right | 2.4 km || 
|-id=682 bgcolor=#d6d6d6
| 325682 ||  || — || October 14, 2009 || Catalina || CSS || — || align=right | 4.5 km || 
|-id=683 bgcolor=#d6d6d6
| 325683 ||  || — || October 15, 2009 || La Sagra || OAM Obs. || — || align=right | 3.1 km || 
|-id=684 bgcolor=#d6d6d6
| 325684 ||  || — || October 15, 2009 || La Sagra || OAM Obs. || — || align=right | 4.1 km || 
|-id=685 bgcolor=#d6d6d6
| 325685 ||  || — || October 2, 2009 || Mount Lemmon || Mount Lemmon Survey || EOS || align=right | 2.4 km || 
|-id=686 bgcolor=#d6d6d6
| 325686 ||  || — || October 15, 2009 || Mount Lemmon || Mount Lemmon Survey || EOS || align=right | 2.4 km || 
|-id=687 bgcolor=#d6d6d6
| 325687 ||  || — || November 11, 2004 || Kitt Peak || Spacewatch || — || align=right | 4.4 km || 
|-id=688 bgcolor=#d6d6d6
| 325688 ||  || — || October 13, 2009 || Socorro || LINEAR || EOS || align=right | 2.6 km || 
|-id=689 bgcolor=#d6d6d6
| 325689 ||  || — || October 18, 2009 || Catalina || CSS || HYG || align=right | 3.9 km || 
|-id=690 bgcolor=#d6d6d6
| 325690 ||  || — || October 18, 2009 || Kitt Peak || Spacewatch || 7:4 || align=right | 4.0 km || 
|-id=691 bgcolor=#d6d6d6
| 325691 ||  || — || October 17, 2009 || La Sagra || OAM Obs. || EOS || align=right | 2.6 km || 
|-id=692 bgcolor=#d6d6d6
| 325692 ||  || — || October 16, 2009 || Catalina || CSS || — || align=right | 3.5 km || 
|-id=693 bgcolor=#d6d6d6
| 325693 ||  || — || October 23, 2009 || Catalina || CSS || Tj (2.99) || align=right | 5.7 km || 
|-id=694 bgcolor=#E9E9E9
| 325694 ||  || — || October 16, 2009 || Catalina || CSS || — || align=right | 3.1 km || 
|-id=695 bgcolor=#C2FFFF
| 325695 ||  || — || October 17, 2009 || La Sagra || OAM Obs. || L4ERY || align=right | 12 km || 
|-id=696 bgcolor=#d6d6d6
| 325696 ||  || — || October 18, 2009 || Mount Lemmon || Mount Lemmon Survey || EMA || align=right | 4.9 km || 
|-id=697 bgcolor=#d6d6d6
| 325697 ||  || — || October 22, 2009 || Mount Lemmon || Mount Lemmon Survey || — || align=right | 4.3 km || 
|-id=698 bgcolor=#d6d6d6
| 325698 ||  || — || October 22, 2009 || Mount Lemmon || Mount Lemmon Survey || — || align=right | 4.7 km || 
|-id=699 bgcolor=#E9E9E9
| 325699 ||  || — || October 18, 2009 || Mount Lemmon || Mount Lemmon Survey || — || align=right | 2.2 km || 
|-id=700 bgcolor=#d6d6d6
| 325700 ||  || — || October 11, 2009 || Mount Lemmon || Mount Lemmon Survey || 3:2 || align=right | 4.9 km || 
|}

325701–325800 

|-bgcolor=#E9E9E9
| 325701 ||  || — || October 22, 2009 || Mount Lemmon || Mount Lemmon Survey || — || align=right | 3.3 km || 
|-id=702 bgcolor=#d6d6d6
| 325702 ||  || — || October 23, 2009 || Mount Lemmon || Mount Lemmon Survey || EOS || align=right | 2.9 km || 
|-id=703 bgcolor=#d6d6d6
| 325703 ||  || — || October 23, 2009 || Mount Lemmon || Mount Lemmon Survey || — || align=right | 5.1 km || 
|-id=704 bgcolor=#fefefe
| 325704 ||  || — || February 14, 2008 || Mount Lemmon || Mount Lemmon Survey || — || align=right data-sort-value="0.99" | 990 m || 
|-id=705 bgcolor=#d6d6d6
| 325705 ||  || — || October 23, 2009 || Mount Lemmon || Mount Lemmon Survey || 7:4 || align=right | 4.9 km || 
|-id=706 bgcolor=#E9E9E9
| 325706 ||  || — || October 18, 2009 || Mount Lemmon || Mount Lemmon Survey || — || align=right | 1.8 km || 
|-id=707 bgcolor=#d6d6d6
| 325707 ||  || — || October 22, 2009 || Mount Lemmon || Mount Lemmon Survey || — || align=right | 2.0 km || 
|-id=708 bgcolor=#d6d6d6
| 325708 ||  || — || October 26, 2009 || Bisei SG Center || BATTeRS || — || align=right | 2.8 km || 
|-id=709 bgcolor=#d6d6d6
| 325709 ||  || — || October 22, 2009 || Socorro || LINEAR || — || align=right | 4.4 km || 
|-id=710 bgcolor=#d6d6d6
| 325710 ||  || — || October 16, 2009 || Catalina || CSS || — || align=right | 4.1 km || 
|-id=711 bgcolor=#E9E9E9
| 325711 ||  || — || October 24, 2009 || Kitt Peak || Spacewatch || — || align=right | 4.3 km || 
|-id=712 bgcolor=#d6d6d6
| 325712 ||  || — || October 22, 2009 || Mount Lemmon || Mount Lemmon Survey || — || align=right | 2.9 km || 
|-id=713 bgcolor=#E9E9E9
| 325713 ||  || — || October 22, 2009 || Mount Lemmon || Mount Lemmon Survey || — || align=right | 2.8 km || 
|-id=714 bgcolor=#d6d6d6
| 325714 ||  || — || April 2, 2002 || Kitt Peak || Spacewatch || — || align=right | 4.0 km || 
|-id=715 bgcolor=#d6d6d6
| 325715 ||  || — || September 17, 2009 || Kitt Peak || Spacewatch || 3:2 || align=right | 4.5 km || 
|-id=716 bgcolor=#E9E9E9
| 325716 ||  || — || October 24, 2009 || Catalina || CSS || — || align=right | 3.6 km || 
|-id=717 bgcolor=#d6d6d6
| 325717 ||  || — || October 25, 2009 || Mount Lemmon || Mount Lemmon Survey || — || align=right | 3.8 km || 
|-id=718 bgcolor=#d6d6d6
| 325718 ||  || — || October 22, 2009 || Mount Lemmon || Mount Lemmon Survey || — || align=right | 3.9 km || 
|-id=719 bgcolor=#E9E9E9
| 325719 ||  || — || October 23, 2009 || Mount Lemmon || Mount Lemmon Survey || — || align=right | 3.1 km || 
|-id=720 bgcolor=#d6d6d6
| 325720 ||  || — || October 23, 2009 || Mount Lemmon || Mount Lemmon Survey || — || align=right | 2.4 km || 
|-id=721 bgcolor=#d6d6d6
| 325721 ||  || — || October 22, 2009 || Mount Lemmon || Mount Lemmon Survey || SYL7:4 || align=right | 4.4 km || 
|-id=722 bgcolor=#d6d6d6
| 325722 ||  || — || October 23, 2009 || Mount Lemmon || Mount Lemmon Survey || HYG || align=right | 3.0 km || 
|-id=723 bgcolor=#d6d6d6
| 325723 ||  || — || October 18, 2009 || La Sagra || OAM Obs. || — || align=right | 3.5 km || 
|-id=724 bgcolor=#d6d6d6
| 325724 ||  || — || October 27, 2009 || Mount Lemmon || Mount Lemmon Survey || — || align=right | 5.0 km || 
|-id=725 bgcolor=#d6d6d6
| 325725 ||  || — || January 23, 2006 || Kitt Peak || Spacewatch || EOS || align=right | 2.5 km || 
|-id=726 bgcolor=#d6d6d6
| 325726 ||  || — || October 22, 2009 || Catalina || CSS || — || align=right | 4.2 km || 
|-id=727 bgcolor=#E9E9E9
| 325727 ||  || — || March 31, 2003 || Kitt Peak || Spacewatch || AGN || align=right | 1.7 km || 
|-id=728 bgcolor=#d6d6d6
| 325728 ||  || — || August 23, 2003 || Palomar || NEAT || — || align=right | 2.8 km || 
|-id=729 bgcolor=#d6d6d6
| 325729 ||  || — || November 9, 2009 || Kitt Peak || Spacewatch || HYG || align=right | 3.7 km || 
|-id=730 bgcolor=#d6d6d6
| 325730 ||  || — || November 11, 2009 || Hibiscus || N. Teamo || — || align=right | 3.8 km || 
|-id=731 bgcolor=#d6d6d6
| 325731 ||  || — || November 8, 2009 || Catalina || CSS || EOS || align=right | 3.4 km || 
|-id=732 bgcolor=#d6d6d6
| 325732 ||  || — || November 14, 2009 || Mayhill || A. Lowe || EOS || align=right | 2.6 km || 
|-id=733 bgcolor=#d6d6d6
| 325733 ||  || — || November 9, 2009 || Mount Lemmon || Mount Lemmon Survey || — || align=right | 4.3 km || 
|-id=734 bgcolor=#d6d6d6
| 325734 ||  || — || November 12, 2009 || La Sagra || OAM Obs. || 7:4 || align=right | 6.8 km || 
|-id=735 bgcolor=#d6d6d6
| 325735 ||  || — || November 11, 2009 || Kitt Peak || Spacewatch || — || align=right | 4.0 km || 
|-id=736 bgcolor=#d6d6d6
| 325736 ||  || — || November 14, 2009 || Socorro || LINEAR || EOS || align=right | 3.4 km || 
|-id=737 bgcolor=#d6d6d6
| 325737 ||  || — || March 14, 2007 || Kitt Peak || Spacewatch || — || align=right | 3.6 km || 
|-id=738 bgcolor=#d6d6d6
| 325738 ||  || — || November 9, 2009 || Catalina || CSS || EMA || align=right | 5.9 km || 
|-id=739 bgcolor=#d6d6d6
| 325739 ||  || — || January 9, 2006 || Mount Lemmon || Mount Lemmon Survey || EOS || align=right | 2.8 km || 
|-id=740 bgcolor=#C2FFFF
| 325740 ||  || — || October 11, 2009 || Mount Lemmon || Mount Lemmon Survey || L4 || align=right | 12 km || 
|-id=741 bgcolor=#d6d6d6
| 325741 ||  || — || November 9, 2009 || Catalina || CSS || — || align=right | 2.7 km || 
|-id=742 bgcolor=#d6d6d6
| 325742 ||  || — || November 9, 2009 || Catalina || CSS || — || align=right | 4.1 km || 
|-id=743 bgcolor=#d6d6d6
| 325743 ||  || — || November 10, 2009 || Mount Lemmon || Mount Lemmon Survey || — || align=right | 4.0 km || 
|-id=744 bgcolor=#d6d6d6
| 325744 ||  || — || November 17, 2009 || Mayhill || A. Lowe || — || align=right | 4.0 km || 
|-id=745 bgcolor=#d6d6d6
| 325745 ||  || — || November 16, 2009 || Kitt Peak || Spacewatch || — || align=right | 4.3 km || 
|-id=746 bgcolor=#d6d6d6
| 325746 ||  || — || November 16, 2009 || Mount Lemmon || Mount Lemmon Survey || — || align=right | 3.5 km || 
|-id=747 bgcolor=#d6d6d6
| 325747 ||  || — || November 19, 2009 || Kitt Peak || Spacewatch || — || align=right | 3.2 km || 
|-id=748 bgcolor=#d6d6d6
| 325748 ||  || — || November 19, 2009 || Mount Lemmon || Mount Lemmon Survey || — || align=right | 3.6 km || 
|-id=749 bgcolor=#d6d6d6
| 325749 ||  || — || November 22, 2009 || Bisei SG Center || BATTeRS || EMA || align=right | 4.9 km || 
|-id=750 bgcolor=#E9E9E9
| 325750 ||  || — || May 14, 2008 || Mount Lemmon || Mount Lemmon Survey || — || align=right | 1.6 km || 
|-id=751 bgcolor=#d6d6d6
| 325751 ||  || — || November 18, 2009 || Kitt Peak || Spacewatch || — || align=right | 4.5 km || 
|-id=752 bgcolor=#d6d6d6
| 325752 ||  || — || November 19, 2009 || Kitt Peak || Spacewatch || EOS || align=right | 2.9 km || 
|-id=753 bgcolor=#E9E9E9
| 325753 ||  || — || October 7, 2004 || Anderson Mesa || LONEOS || — || align=right | 3.9 km || 
|-id=754 bgcolor=#d6d6d6
| 325754 ||  || — || November 19, 2009 || La Sagra || OAM Obs. || EOS || align=right | 2.1 km || 
|-id=755 bgcolor=#d6d6d6
| 325755 ||  || — || November 20, 2009 || La Sagra || OAM Obs. || EOS || align=right | 4.3 km || 
|-id=756 bgcolor=#E9E9E9
| 325756 ||  || — || November 19, 2009 || Mount Lemmon || Mount Lemmon Survey || JUN || align=right | 1.5 km || 
|-id=757 bgcolor=#d6d6d6
| 325757 ||  || — || November 21, 2009 || Kitt Peak || Spacewatch || HYG || align=right | 2.7 km || 
|-id=758 bgcolor=#d6d6d6
| 325758 ||  || — || November 24, 2009 || Kitt Peak || Spacewatch || — || align=right | 3.4 km || 
|-id=759 bgcolor=#d6d6d6
| 325759 ||  || — || November 16, 2009 || La Sagra || OAM Obs. || — || align=right | 4.2 km || 
|-id=760 bgcolor=#d6d6d6
| 325760 ||  || — || November 17, 2009 || Catalina || CSS || — || align=right | 5.1 km || 
|-id=761 bgcolor=#d6d6d6
| 325761 ||  || — || September 16, 2003 || Kitt Peak || Spacewatch || — || align=right | 3.4 km || 
|-id=762 bgcolor=#d6d6d6
| 325762 ||  || — || April 13, 2004 || Kitt Peak || Spacewatch || 7:4 || align=right | 6.3 km || 
|-id=763 bgcolor=#d6d6d6
| 325763 ||  || — || January 31, 2006 || Kitt Peak || Spacewatch || — || align=right | 6.6 km || 
|-id=764 bgcolor=#d6d6d6
| 325764 ||  || — || January 12, 2010 || WISE || WISE || — || align=right | 4.6 km || 
|-id=765 bgcolor=#d6d6d6
| 325765 ||  || — || September 26, 2003 || Apache Point || SDSS || — || align=right | 4.8 km || 
|-id=766 bgcolor=#FA8072
| 325766 ||  || — || May 15, 2010 || WISE || WISE || — || align=right | 1.1 km || 
|-id=767 bgcolor=#fefefe
| 325767 ||  || — || May 29, 2010 || WISE || WISE || CLA || align=right | 1.6 km || 
|-id=768 bgcolor=#E9E9E9
| 325768 ||  || — || June 3, 2010 || Kitt Peak || Spacewatch || — || align=right | 2.2 km || 
|-id=769 bgcolor=#FFC2E0
| 325769 ||  || — || June 12, 2010 || Siding Spring || SSS || AMO +1km || align=right data-sort-value="0.96" | 960 m || 
|-id=770 bgcolor=#d6d6d6
| 325770 ||  || — || June 16, 2010 || WISE || WISE || — || align=right | 2.6 km || 
|-id=771 bgcolor=#fefefe
| 325771 ||  || — || December 30, 2007 || Kitt Peak || Spacewatch || ERI || align=right | 2.3 km || 
|-id=772 bgcolor=#E9E9E9
| 325772 ||  || — || October 16, 2001 || Palomar || NEAT || — || align=right | 2.7 km || 
|-id=773 bgcolor=#E9E9E9
| 325773 ||  || — || February 9, 2008 || Mount Lemmon || Mount Lemmon Survey || — || align=right | 2.1 km || 
|-id=774 bgcolor=#E9E9E9
| 325774 ||  || — || July 15, 2010 || WISE || WISE || JUN || align=right | 1.7 km || 
|-id=775 bgcolor=#fefefe
| 325775 ||  || — || July 15, 2010 || WISE || WISE || CLA || align=right | 1.9 km || 
|-id=776 bgcolor=#fefefe
| 325776 ||  || — || January 19, 2008 || Mount Lemmon || Mount Lemmon Survey || — || align=right | 1.3 km || 
|-id=777 bgcolor=#fefefe
| 325777 ||  || — || January 20, 2008 || Kitt Peak || Spacewatch || V || align=right | 1.9 km || 
|-id=778 bgcolor=#E9E9E9
| 325778 ||  || — || March 12, 2008 || Kitt Peak || Spacewatch || — || align=right | 2.9 km || 
|-id=779 bgcolor=#E9E9E9
| 325779 ||  || — || October 3, 2006 || Mount Lemmon || Mount Lemmon Survey || — || align=right | 2.4 km || 
|-id=780 bgcolor=#E9E9E9
| 325780 ||  || — || February 29, 2008 || Kitt Peak || Spacewatch || — || align=right | 3.1 km || 
|-id=781 bgcolor=#E9E9E9
| 325781 ||  || — || September 1, 2005 || Kitt Peak || Spacewatch || — || align=right | 2.7 km || 
|-id=782 bgcolor=#E9E9E9
| 325782 ||  || — || January 13, 2003 || Kitt Peak || Spacewatch || — || align=right | 1.7 km || 
|-id=783 bgcolor=#fefefe
| 325783 ||  || — || August 4, 2010 || Socorro || LINEAR || H || align=right data-sort-value="0.78" | 780 m || 
|-id=784 bgcolor=#d6d6d6
| 325784 ||  || — || August 6, 2010 || WISE || WISE || — || align=right | 1.8 km || 
|-id=785 bgcolor=#E9E9E9
| 325785 ||  || — || March 1, 2008 || Kitt Peak || Spacewatch || — || align=right | 2.7 km || 
|-id=786 bgcolor=#fefefe
| 325786 ||  || — || September 3, 1999 || Kitt Peak || Spacewatch || MAS || align=right data-sort-value="0.84" | 840 m || 
|-id=787 bgcolor=#fefefe
| 325787 ||  || — || August 9, 2010 || Socorro || LINEAR || — || align=right data-sort-value="0.98" | 980 m || 
|-id=788 bgcolor=#E9E9E9
| 325788 ||  || — || December 14, 2006 || Palomar || NEAT || — || align=right | 2.5 km || 
|-id=789 bgcolor=#fefefe
| 325789 ||  || — || August 16, 2010 || La Sagra || OAM Obs. || — || align=right data-sort-value="0.80" | 800 m || 
|-id=790 bgcolor=#E9E9E9
| 325790 ||  || — || January 8, 2003 || Anderson Mesa || LONEOS || — || align=right | 3.9 km || 
|-id=791 bgcolor=#fefefe
| 325791 ||  || — || September 1, 2010 || ESA OGS || ESA OGS || V || align=right data-sort-value="0.74" | 740 m || 
|-id=792 bgcolor=#E9E9E9
| 325792 ||  || — || September 4, 2010 || Kitt Peak || Spacewatch || JUN || align=right | 1.3 km || 
|-id=793 bgcolor=#E9E9E9
| 325793 ||  || — || September 6, 2010 || Kitt Peak || Spacewatch || JUN || align=right | 1.2 km || 
|-id=794 bgcolor=#fefefe
| 325794 ||  || — || February 8, 2008 || Kitt Peak || Spacewatch || NYS || align=right data-sort-value="0.78" | 780 m || 
|-id=795 bgcolor=#E9E9E9
| 325795 ||  || — || March 29, 2008 || Catalina || CSS || ADE || align=right | 2.8 km || 
|-id=796 bgcolor=#fefefe
| 325796 ||  || — || November 6, 2007 || Mount Lemmon || Mount Lemmon Survey || V || align=right data-sort-value="0.80" | 800 m || 
|-id=797 bgcolor=#fefefe
| 325797 ||  || — || September 18, 2007 || Mount Lemmon || Mount Lemmon Survey || V || align=right data-sort-value="0.67" | 670 m || 
|-id=798 bgcolor=#fefefe
| 325798 ||  || — || July 16, 2007 || Siding Spring || SSS || H || align=right data-sort-value="0.68" | 680 m || 
|-id=799 bgcolor=#fefefe
| 325799 ||  || — || May 22, 2001 || Anderson Mesa || LONEOS || H || align=right | 1.1 km || 
|-id=800 bgcolor=#fefefe
| 325800 ||  || — || August 24, 2000 || Socorro || LINEAR || — || align=right data-sort-value="0.87" | 870 m || 
|}

325801–325900 

|-bgcolor=#fefefe
| 325801 ||  || — || September 10, 2010 || Catalina || CSS || FLO || align=right data-sort-value="0.81" | 810 m || 
|-id=802 bgcolor=#fefefe
| 325802 ||  || — || September 22, 2003 || Anderson Mesa || LONEOS || FLO || align=right data-sort-value="0.71" | 710 m || 
|-id=803 bgcolor=#fefefe
| 325803 ||  || — || November 1, 2000 || Socorro || LINEAR || — || align=right data-sort-value="0.95" | 950 m || 
|-id=804 bgcolor=#fefefe
| 325804 ||  || — || October 16, 2007 || Mount Lemmon || Mount Lemmon Survey || — || align=right data-sort-value="0.71" | 710 m || 
|-id=805 bgcolor=#fefefe
| 325805 ||  || — || September 28, 2003 || Kitt Peak || Spacewatch || — || align=right data-sort-value="0.94" | 940 m || 
|-id=806 bgcolor=#fefefe
| 325806 ||  || — || December 25, 2003 || Kitt Peak || Spacewatch || NYS || align=right data-sort-value="0.69" | 690 m || 
|-id=807 bgcolor=#fefefe
| 325807 ||  || — || April 2, 2005 || Mount Lemmon || Mount Lemmon Survey || — || align=right data-sort-value="0.87" | 870 m || 
|-id=808 bgcolor=#fefefe
| 325808 ||  || — || November 19, 2003 || Anderson Mesa || LONEOS || V || align=right data-sort-value="0.72" | 720 m || 
|-id=809 bgcolor=#fefefe
| 325809 ||  || — || April 4, 2005 || Catalina || CSS || V || align=right data-sort-value="0.83" | 830 m || 
|-id=810 bgcolor=#fefefe
| 325810 ||  || — || August 29, 2006 || Kitt Peak || Spacewatch || — || align=right data-sort-value="0.89" | 890 m || 
|-id=811 bgcolor=#fefefe
| 325811 ||  || — || September 11, 2010 || Kitt Peak || Spacewatch || — || align=right data-sort-value="0.59" | 590 m || 
|-id=812 bgcolor=#fefefe
| 325812 Zouchenglu ||  ||  || January 3, 2008 || XuYi || PMO NEO || — || align=right data-sort-value="0.71" | 710 m || 
|-id=813 bgcolor=#E9E9E9
| 325813 ||  || — || January 7, 2003 || Socorro || LINEAR || JUN || align=right | 1.2 km || 
|-id=814 bgcolor=#fefefe
| 325814 ||  || — || February 8, 2008 || Mount Lemmon || Mount Lemmon Survey || — || align=right | 1.0 km || 
|-id=815 bgcolor=#E9E9E9
| 325815 ||  || — || September 30, 2006 || Catalina || CSS || — || align=right data-sort-value="0.96" | 960 m || 
|-id=816 bgcolor=#E9E9E9
| 325816 ||  || — || December 16, 2006 || Mount Lemmon || Mount Lemmon Survey || — || align=right | 1.6 km || 
|-id=817 bgcolor=#fefefe
| 325817 ||  || — || November 1, 2007 || Kitt Peak || Spacewatch || — || align=right data-sort-value="0.80" | 800 m || 
|-id=818 bgcolor=#fefefe
| 325818 ||  || — || March 24, 1998 || Kitt Peak || Spacewatch || — || align=right | 1.1 km || 
|-id=819 bgcolor=#fefefe
| 325819 ||  || — || March 11, 2005 || Mount Lemmon || Mount Lemmon Survey || V || align=right data-sort-value="0.58" | 580 m || 
|-id=820 bgcolor=#E9E9E9
| 325820 ||  || — || November 18, 2006 || Kitt Peak || Spacewatch || — || align=right | 1.3 km || 
|-id=821 bgcolor=#fefefe
| 325821 ||  || — || March 3, 2005 || Catalina || CSS || — || align=right data-sort-value="0.82" | 820 m || 
|-id=822 bgcolor=#fefefe
| 325822 ||  || — || August 28, 2003 || Palomar || NEAT || — || align=right data-sort-value="0.76" | 760 m || 
|-id=823 bgcolor=#fefefe
| 325823 ||  || — || October 20, 2003 || Kitt Peak || Spacewatch || — || align=right data-sort-value="0.86" | 860 m || 
|-id=824 bgcolor=#E9E9E9
| 325824 ||  || — || April 7, 2008 || Mount Lemmon || Mount Lemmon Survey || — || align=right | 1.2 km || 
|-id=825 bgcolor=#fefefe
| 325825 ||  || — || August 29, 2006 || Kitt Peak || Spacewatch || — || align=right data-sort-value="0.87" | 870 m || 
|-id=826 bgcolor=#fefefe
| 325826 ||  || — || February 3, 2008 || Kitt Peak || Spacewatch || NYS || align=right data-sort-value="0.61" | 610 m || 
|-id=827 bgcolor=#E9E9E9
| 325827 ||  || — || July 12, 2005 || Mount Lemmon || Mount Lemmon Survey || — || align=right | 1.5 km || 
|-id=828 bgcolor=#fefefe
| 325828 ||  || — || March 21, 1999 || Apache Point || SDSS || — || align=right data-sort-value="0.81" | 810 m || 
|-id=829 bgcolor=#fefefe
| 325829 ||  || — || November 5, 2007 || Mount Lemmon || Mount Lemmon Survey || V || align=right data-sort-value="0.71" | 710 m || 
|-id=830 bgcolor=#fefefe
| 325830 ||  || — || October 10, 2007 || Kitt Peak || Spacewatch || — || align=right data-sort-value="0.81" | 810 m || 
|-id=831 bgcolor=#fefefe
| 325831 ||  || — || December 6, 2007 || Kitt Peak || Spacewatch || NYS || align=right data-sort-value="0.58" | 580 m || 
|-id=832 bgcolor=#E9E9E9
| 325832 ||  || — || December 3, 2002 || Haleakala || NEAT || — || align=right | 1.2 km || 
|-id=833 bgcolor=#fefefe
| 325833 ||  || — || August 16, 2006 || Palomar || NEAT || — || align=right data-sort-value="0.90" | 900 m || 
|-id=834 bgcolor=#fefefe
| 325834 ||  || — || September 29, 2010 || La Sagra || OAM Obs. || NYS || align=right data-sort-value="0.71" | 710 m || 
|-id=835 bgcolor=#fefefe
| 325835 ||  || — || March 9, 2005 || Kitt Peak || Spacewatch || — || align=right data-sort-value="0.91" | 910 m || 
|-id=836 bgcolor=#E9E9E9
| 325836 ||  || — || October 23, 2006 || Catalina || CSS || — || align=right | 2.6 km || 
|-id=837 bgcolor=#fefefe
| 325837 ||  || — || September 21, 2003 || Anderson Mesa || LONEOS || — || align=right data-sort-value="0.87" | 870 m || 
|-id=838 bgcolor=#fefefe
| 325838 ||  || — || August 28, 2003 || Palomar || NEAT || FLO || align=right data-sort-value="0.70" | 700 m || 
|-id=839 bgcolor=#fefefe
| 325839 ||  || — || May 25, 2006 || Kitt Peak || Spacewatch || — || align=right data-sort-value="0.76" | 760 m || 
|-id=840 bgcolor=#E9E9E9
| 325840 ||  || — || February 10, 2008 || Kitt Peak || Spacewatch || — || align=right data-sort-value="0.98" | 980 m || 
|-id=841 bgcolor=#fefefe
| 325841 ||  || — || November 4, 1999 || Socorro || LINEAR || MAS || align=right data-sort-value="0.84" | 840 m || 
|-id=842 bgcolor=#fefefe
| 325842 ||  || — || February 24, 2009 || Catalina || CSS || — || align=right | 1.1 km || 
|-id=843 bgcolor=#fefefe
| 325843 ||  || — || October 19, 2003 || Apache Point || SDSS || FLO || align=right data-sort-value="0.62" | 620 m || 
|-id=844 bgcolor=#E9E9E9
| 325844 ||  || — || November 16, 2006 || Kitt Peak || Spacewatch || — || align=right | 1.9 km || 
|-id=845 bgcolor=#fefefe
| 325845 ||  || — || February 2, 2001 || Kitt Peak || Spacewatch || NYS || align=right data-sort-value="0.63" | 630 m || 
|-id=846 bgcolor=#fefefe
| 325846 ||  || — || August 21, 2006 || Kitt Peak || Spacewatch || — || align=right data-sort-value="0.89" | 890 m || 
|-id=847 bgcolor=#fefefe
| 325847 ||  || — || March 10, 2004 || Palomar || NEAT || NYS || align=right data-sort-value="0.76" | 760 m || 
|-id=848 bgcolor=#fefefe
| 325848 ||  || — || October 24, 2003 || Kitt Peak || Spacewatch || V || align=right data-sort-value="0.66" | 660 m || 
|-id=849 bgcolor=#fefefe
| 325849 ||  || — || August 26, 2000 || Socorro || LINEAR || FLO || align=right data-sort-value="0.78" | 780 m || 
|-id=850 bgcolor=#E9E9E9
| 325850 ||  || — || October 31, 2006 || Mount Lemmon || Mount Lemmon Survey || — || align=right | 1.3 km || 
|-id=851 bgcolor=#d6d6d6
| 325851 ||  || — || September 12, 1994 || Kitt Peak || Spacewatch || — || align=right | 2.5 km || 
|-id=852 bgcolor=#fefefe
| 325852 ||  || — || April 30, 2005 || Kitt Peak || Spacewatch || CLA || align=right | 1.5 km || 
|-id=853 bgcolor=#E9E9E9
| 325853 ||  || — || March 30, 2008 || Kitt Peak || Spacewatch || — || align=right | 1.7 km || 
|-id=854 bgcolor=#fefefe
| 325854 ||  || — || October 11, 1999 || Kitt Peak || Spacewatch || V || align=right data-sort-value="0.61" | 610 m || 
|-id=855 bgcolor=#fefefe
| 325855 ||  || — || October 1, 2003 || Kitt Peak || Spacewatch || — || align=right data-sort-value="0.69" | 690 m || 
|-id=856 bgcolor=#fefefe
| 325856 ||  || — || December 1, 2003 || Kitt Peak || Spacewatch || V || align=right data-sort-value="0.69" | 690 m || 
|-id=857 bgcolor=#fefefe
| 325857 ||  || — || December 6, 2007 || Catalina || CSS || — || align=right | 1.1 km || 
|-id=858 bgcolor=#E9E9E9
| 325858 ||  || — || November 16, 2006 || Catalina || CSS || — || align=right | 1.6 km || 
|-id=859 bgcolor=#fefefe
| 325859 ||  || — || April 11, 2005 || Mount Lemmon || Mount Lemmon Survey || MAS || align=right data-sort-value="0.71" | 710 m || 
|-id=860 bgcolor=#fefefe
| 325860 ||  || — || October 15, 1995 || Kitt Peak || Spacewatch || — || align=right data-sort-value="0.73" | 730 m || 
|-id=861 bgcolor=#d6d6d6
| 325861 ||  || — || November 25, 2005 || Catalina || CSS || — || align=right | 2.4 km || 
|-id=862 bgcolor=#fefefe
| 325862 ||  || — || December 4, 2007 || Kitt Peak || Spacewatch || — || align=right data-sort-value="0.97" | 970 m || 
|-id=863 bgcolor=#E9E9E9
| 325863 ||  || — || October 15, 2001 || Kitt Peak || Spacewatch || — || align=right | 2.6 km || 
|-id=864 bgcolor=#fefefe
| 325864 ||  || — || April 2, 2006 || Mount Lemmon || Mount Lemmon Survey || — || align=right data-sort-value="0.68" | 680 m || 
|-id=865 bgcolor=#E9E9E9
| 325865 ||  || — || April 30, 2008 || Mount Lemmon || Mount Lemmon Survey || — || align=right | 1.4 km || 
|-id=866 bgcolor=#fefefe
| 325866 ||  || — || December 15, 2004 || Kitt Peak || Spacewatch || FLO || align=right data-sort-value="0.60" | 600 m || 
|-id=867 bgcolor=#d6d6d6
| 325867 ||  || — || October 5, 2004 || Anderson Mesa || LONEOS || — || align=right | 4.1 km || 
|-id=868 bgcolor=#E9E9E9
| 325868 ||  || — || November 22, 2006 || Catalina || CSS || — || align=right | 1.2 km || 
|-id=869 bgcolor=#d6d6d6
| 325869 ||  || — || May 11, 2007 || Mount Lemmon || Mount Lemmon Survey || — || align=right | 5.1 km || 
|-id=870 bgcolor=#E9E9E9
| 325870 ||  || — || December 11, 2006 || Kitt Peak || Spacewatch || — || align=right | 1.5 km || 
|-id=871 bgcolor=#E9E9E9
| 325871 ||  || — || April 29, 2009 || Mount Lemmon || Mount Lemmon Survey || EUN || align=right | 1.8 km || 
|-id=872 bgcolor=#d6d6d6
| 325872 ||  || — || January 5, 2006 || Catalina || CSS || — || align=right | 3.2 km || 
|-id=873 bgcolor=#E9E9E9
| 325873 ||  || — || December 13, 2006 || Kitt Peak || Spacewatch || — || align=right | 2.6 km || 
|-id=874 bgcolor=#fefefe
| 325874 ||  || — || March 17, 2005 || Mount Lemmon || Mount Lemmon Survey || FLO || align=right data-sort-value="0.83" | 830 m || 
|-id=875 bgcolor=#fefefe
| 325875 ||  || — || May 25, 2006 || Mount Lemmon || Mount Lemmon Survey || MAS || align=right data-sort-value="0.79" | 790 m || 
|-id=876 bgcolor=#E9E9E9
| 325876 ||  || — || March 1, 2008 || Kitt Peak || Spacewatch || GEF || align=right | 1.5 km || 
|-id=877 bgcolor=#C2FFFF
| 325877 ||  || — || September 27, 2009 || Kitt Peak || Spacewatch || L4 || align=right | 11 km || 
|-id=878 bgcolor=#fefefe
| 325878 ||  || — || December 19, 2007 || Mount Lemmon || Mount Lemmon Survey || FLO || align=right data-sort-value="0.62" | 620 m || 
|-id=879 bgcolor=#d6d6d6
| 325879 ||  || — || March 19, 2007 || Mount Lemmon || Mount Lemmon Survey || — || align=right | 5.9 km || 
|-id=880 bgcolor=#fefefe
| 325880 ||  || — || December 18, 2004 || Kitt Peak || Spacewatch || — || align=right data-sort-value="0.76" | 760 m || 
|-id=881 bgcolor=#d6d6d6
| 325881 ||  || — || July 23, 2010 || WISE || WISE || BRA || align=right | 1.9 km || 
|-id=882 bgcolor=#E9E9E9
| 325882 ||  || — || January 10, 2003 || Socorro || LINEAR || — || align=right | 2.3 km || 
|-id=883 bgcolor=#E9E9E9
| 325883 ||  || — || November 17, 2006 || Mount Lemmon || Mount Lemmon Survey || — || align=right | 1.7 km || 
|-id=884 bgcolor=#fefefe
| 325884 ||  || — || October 2, 2000 || Socorro || LINEAR || — || align=right data-sort-value="0.86" | 860 m || 
|-id=885 bgcolor=#E9E9E9
| 325885 ||  || — || November 10, 2006 || Kitt Peak || Spacewatch || MIS || align=right | 2.5 km || 
|-id=886 bgcolor=#E9E9E9
| 325886 ||  || — || November 1, 2006 || Mount Lemmon || Mount Lemmon Survey || — || align=right | 2.4 km || 
|-id=887 bgcolor=#E9E9E9
| 325887 ||  || — || February 21, 2003 || Palomar || NEAT || — || align=right | 1.9 km || 
|-id=888 bgcolor=#fefefe
| 325888 ||  || — || April 2, 2002 || Kitt Peak || Spacewatch || — || align=right | 1.0 km || 
|-id=889 bgcolor=#E9E9E9
| 325889 ||  || — || September 12, 2001 || Socorro || LINEAR || — || align=right | 1.7 km || 
|-id=890 bgcolor=#fefefe
| 325890 ||  || — || June 4, 2006 || Mount Lemmon || Mount Lemmon Survey || — || align=right data-sort-value="0.75" | 750 m || 
|-id=891 bgcolor=#fefefe
| 325891 ||  || — || September 15, 2006 || Kitt Peak || Spacewatch || — || align=right | 1.0 km || 
|-id=892 bgcolor=#fefefe
| 325892 ||  || — || September 27, 2003 || Anderson Mesa || LONEOS || FLO || align=right data-sort-value="0.74" | 740 m || 
|-id=893 bgcolor=#E9E9E9
| 325893 ||  || — || November 22, 2006 || Mount Lemmon || Mount Lemmon Survey || — || align=right | 2.5 km || 
|-id=894 bgcolor=#fefefe
| 325894 ||  || — || November 12, 1999 || Kitt Peak || Spacewatch || — || align=right data-sort-value="0.90" | 900 m || 
|-id=895 bgcolor=#fefefe
| 325895 ||  || — || January 2, 2000 || Kitt Peak || Spacewatch || MAS || align=right data-sort-value="0.86" | 860 m || 
|-id=896 bgcolor=#E9E9E9
| 325896 ||  || — || October 19, 2006 || Catalina || CSS || — || align=right | 1.1 km || 
|-id=897 bgcolor=#d6d6d6
| 325897 ||  || — || November 22, 2005 || Kitt Peak || Spacewatch || — || align=right | 2.4 km || 
|-id=898 bgcolor=#E9E9E9
| 325898 ||  || — || August 28, 2005 || Kitt Peak || Spacewatch || MRX || align=right | 1.0 km || 
|-id=899 bgcolor=#d6d6d6
| 325899 ||  || — || January 28, 2007 || Kitt Peak || Spacewatch || — || align=right | 4.0 km || 
|-id=900 bgcolor=#fefefe
| 325900 ||  || — || March 19, 2009 || Kitt Peak || Spacewatch || — || align=right data-sort-value="0.76" | 760 m || 
|}

325901–326000 

|-bgcolor=#E9E9E9
| 325901 ||  || — || October 1, 2005 || Kitt Peak || Spacewatch || MRX || align=right | 1.4 km || 
|-id=902 bgcolor=#E9E9E9
| 325902 ||  || — || September 18, 2001 || Apache Point || SDSS || — || align=right | 2.1 km || 
|-id=903 bgcolor=#fefefe
| 325903 ||  || — || November 14, 2007 || Mount Lemmon || Mount Lemmon Survey || FLO || align=right data-sort-value="0.75" | 750 m || 
|-id=904 bgcolor=#E9E9E9
| 325904 ||  || — || October 13, 1993 || Kitt Peak || Spacewatch || — || align=right | 1.6 km || 
|-id=905 bgcolor=#d6d6d6
| 325905 ||  || — || February 21, 2007 || Catalina || CSS || — || align=right | 3.1 km || 
|-id=906 bgcolor=#E9E9E9
| 325906 ||  || — || January 27, 2007 || Mount Lemmon || Mount Lemmon Survey || — || align=right | 2.4 km || 
|-id=907 bgcolor=#E9E9E9
| 325907 ||  || — || October 22, 2006 || Mount Lemmon || Mount Lemmon Survey || — || align=right | 2.9 km || 
|-id=908 bgcolor=#d6d6d6
| 325908 ||  || — || March 26, 2007 || Mount Lemmon || Mount Lemmon Survey || — || align=right | 3.1 km || 
|-id=909 bgcolor=#E9E9E9
| 325909 ||  || — || February 28, 2008 || Kitt Peak || Spacewatch || — || align=right | 1.5 km || 
|-id=910 bgcolor=#fefefe
| 325910 ||  || — || August 29, 2006 || Kitt Peak || Spacewatch || — || align=right | 1.6 km || 
|-id=911 bgcolor=#d6d6d6
| 325911 ||  || — || November 1, 2005 || Kitt Peak || Spacewatch || — || align=right | 3.8 km || 
|-id=912 bgcolor=#E9E9E9
| 325912 ||  || — || August 31, 2005 || Kitt Peak || Spacewatch || — || align=right | 2.0 km || 
|-id=913 bgcolor=#d6d6d6
| 325913 ||  || — || March 18, 2007 || Kitt Peak || Spacewatch || — || align=right | 2.8 km || 
|-id=914 bgcolor=#fefefe
| 325914 ||  || — || January 21, 2004 || Socorro || LINEAR || V || align=right data-sort-value="0.87" | 870 m || 
|-id=915 bgcolor=#E9E9E9
| 325915 ||  || — || July 17, 2001 || Haleakala || NEAT || — || align=right | 2.0 km || 
|-id=916 bgcolor=#E9E9E9
| 325916 ||  || — || March 28, 2008 || Kitt Peak || Spacewatch || WIT || align=right | 1.2 km || 
|-id=917 bgcolor=#E9E9E9
| 325917 ||  || — || November 15, 2006 || Catalina || CSS || — || align=right | 1.7 km || 
|-id=918 bgcolor=#d6d6d6
| 325918 ||  || — || February 22, 2006 || Anderson Mesa || LONEOS || — || align=right | 3.5 km || 
|-id=919 bgcolor=#E9E9E9
| 325919 ||  || — || October 24, 2001 || Palomar || NEAT || — || align=right | 2.9 km || 
|-id=920 bgcolor=#E9E9E9
| 325920 ||  || — || March 15, 2008 || Kitt Peak || Spacewatch || — || align=right | 1.2 km || 
|-id=921 bgcolor=#E9E9E9
| 325921 ||  || — || December 13, 2006 || Kitt Peak || Spacewatch || EUN || align=right | 1.7 km || 
|-id=922 bgcolor=#fefefe
| 325922 ||  || — || March 11, 2005 || Kitt Peak || Spacewatch || V || align=right data-sort-value="0.83" | 830 m || 
|-id=923 bgcolor=#d6d6d6
| 325923 ||  || — || November 10, 2005 || Kitt Peak || Spacewatch || — || align=right | 3.6 km || 
|-id=924 bgcolor=#fefefe
| 325924 ||  || — || November 12, 1999 || Socorro || LINEAR || — || align=right | 1.2 km || 
|-id=925 bgcolor=#fefefe
| 325925 ||  || — || April 22, 2009 || Kitt Peak || Spacewatch || — || align=right data-sort-value="0.67" | 670 m || 
|-id=926 bgcolor=#fefefe
| 325926 ||  || — || July 27, 1995 || Kitt Peak || Spacewatch || V || align=right data-sort-value="0.62" | 620 m || 
|-id=927 bgcolor=#E9E9E9
| 325927 ||  || — || March 29, 2008 || Kitt Peak || Spacewatch || — || align=right | 2.4 km || 
|-id=928 bgcolor=#E9E9E9
| 325928 ||  || — || March 16, 2004 || Palomar || NEAT || — || align=right | 1.8 km || 
|-id=929 bgcolor=#fefefe
| 325929 ||  || — || December 18, 2007 || Kitt Peak || Spacewatch || slow || align=right data-sort-value="0.88" | 880 m || 
|-id=930 bgcolor=#fefefe
| 325930 ||  || — || October 24, 2007 || Mount Lemmon || Mount Lemmon Survey || — || align=right data-sort-value="0.80" | 800 m || 
|-id=931 bgcolor=#fefefe
| 325931 ||  || — || September 25, 2000 || Kitt Peak || Spacewatch || — || align=right data-sort-value="0.99" | 990 m || 
|-id=932 bgcolor=#d6d6d6
| 325932 ||  || — || August 1, 2009 || Kitt Peak || Spacewatch || — || align=right | 3.1 km || 
|-id=933 bgcolor=#E9E9E9
| 325933 ||  || — || October 2, 2005 || Mount Lemmon || Mount Lemmon Survey || — || align=right | 2.2 km || 
|-id=934 bgcolor=#fefefe
| 325934 ||  || — || September 21, 2003 || Kitt Peak || Spacewatch || — || align=right data-sort-value="0.89" | 890 m || 
|-id=935 bgcolor=#d6d6d6
| 325935 ||  || — || October 14, 1999 || Kitt Peak || Spacewatch || TIR || align=right | 2.6 km || 
|-id=936 bgcolor=#C2FFFF
| 325936 ||  || — || September 19, 2009 || Catalina || CSS || L4 || align=right | 13 km || 
|-id=937 bgcolor=#E9E9E9
| 325937 ||  || — || September 12, 2001 || Socorro || LINEAR || — || align=right | 1.8 km || 
|-id=938 bgcolor=#fefefe
| 325938 ||  || — || February 11, 2002 || Socorro || LINEAR || — || align=right data-sort-value="0.70" | 700 m || 
|-id=939 bgcolor=#fefefe
| 325939 ||  || — || November 26, 2003 || Kitt Peak || Spacewatch || — || align=right | 1.0 km || 
|-id=940 bgcolor=#E9E9E9
| 325940 ||  || — || August 23, 2001 || Haleakala || NEAT || GER || align=right | 2.1 km || 
|-id=941 bgcolor=#d6d6d6
| 325941 ||  || — || January 2, 2006 || Socorro || LINEAR || — || align=right | 3.8 km || 
|-id=942 bgcolor=#E9E9E9
| 325942 ||  || — || February 26, 2008 || Mount Lemmon || Mount Lemmon Survey || — || align=right | 1.4 km || 
|-id=943 bgcolor=#E9E9E9
| 325943 ||  || — || February 10, 2008 || Mount Lemmon || Mount Lemmon Survey || — || align=right | 1.6 km || 
|-id=944 bgcolor=#d6d6d6
| 325944 ||  || — || March 15, 2007 || Mount Lemmon || Mount Lemmon Survey || — || align=right | 3.5 km || 
|-id=945 bgcolor=#C2FFFF
| 325945 ||  || — || September 24, 2009 || Mount Lemmon || Mount Lemmon Survey || L4 || align=right | 12 km || 
|-id=946 bgcolor=#fefefe
| 325946 ||  || — || September 5, 2010 || Mount Lemmon || Mount Lemmon Survey || ERI || align=right | 1.7 km || 
|-id=947 bgcolor=#E9E9E9
| 325947 ||  || — || August 31, 2005 || Kitt Peak || Spacewatch || — || align=right | 2.6 km || 
|-id=948 bgcolor=#E9E9E9
| 325948 ||  || — || November 17, 2006 || Kitt Peak || Spacewatch || — || align=right | 1.8 km || 
|-id=949 bgcolor=#fefefe
| 325949 ||  || — || March 10, 2005 || Mount Lemmon || Mount Lemmon Survey || — || align=right data-sort-value="0.71" | 710 m || 
|-id=950 bgcolor=#fefefe
| 325950 ||  || — || April 29, 2009 || Kitt Peak || Spacewatch || — || align=right data-sort-value="0.96" | 960 m || 
|-id=951 bgcolor=#E9E9E9
| 325951 ||  || — || December 9, 2006 || Kitt Peak || Spacewatch || — || align=right | 1.6 km || 
|-id=952 bgcolor=#d6d6d6
| 325952 ||  || — || August 17, 2009 || Kitt Peak || Spacewatch || — || align=right | 3.5 km || 
|-id=953 bgcolor=#fefefe
| 325953 ||  || — || October 7, 1999 || Socorro || LINEAR || MAS || align=right data-sort-value="0.85" | 850 m || 
|-id=954 bgcolor=#fefefe
| 325954 ||  || — || January 7, 2005 || Kitt Peak || Spacewatch || — || align=right data-sort-value="0.78" | 780 m || 
|-id=955 bgcolor=#fefefe
| 325955 ||  || — || September 19, 2006 || Catalina || CSS || LCI || align=right | 1.3 km || 
|-id=956 bgcolor=#E9E9E9
| 325956 ||  || — || September 1, 2005 || Kitt Peak || Spacewatch || — || align=right | 1.4 km || 
|-id=957 bgcolor=#fefefe
| 325957 ||  || — || April 5, 2003 || Kitt Peak || Spacewatch || — || align=right data-sort-value="0.78" | 780 m || 
|-id=958 bgcolor=#d6d6d6
| 325958 ||  || — || March 19, 2006 || Siding Spring || SSS || EUP || align=right | 4.9 km || 
|-id=959 bgcolor=#d6d6d6
| 325959 ||  || — || October 4, 2000 || Kitt Peak || Spacewatch || — || align=right | 2.3 km || 
|-id=960 bgcolor=#E9E9E9
| 325960 ||  || — || January 26, 2003 || Haleakala || NEAT || — || align=right | 3.1 km || 
|-id=961 bgcolor=#E9E9E9
| 325961 ||  || — || October 28, 2010 || Mount Lemmon || Mount Lemmon Survey || HEN || align=right | 1.1 km || 
|-id=962 bgcolor=#E9E9E9
| 325962 ||  || — || October 15, 2001 || Kitt Peak || Spacewatch || — || align=right | 1.6 km || 
|-id=963 bgcolor=#E9E9E9
| 325963 ||  || — || March 28, 2008 || Kitt Peak || Spacewatch || — || align=right | 2.4 km || 
|-id=964 bgcolor=#fefefe
| 325964 ||  || — || October 22, 2003 || Apache Point || SDSS || — || align=right data-sort-value="0.91" | 910 m || 
|-id=965 bgcolor=#d6d6d6
| 325965 ||  || — || January 6, 2006 || Catalina || CSS || URS || align=right | 3.8 km || 
|-id=966 bgcolor=#d6d6d6
| 325966 ||  || — || January 7, 2006 || Kitt Peak || Spacewatch || — || align=right | 3.6 km || 
|-id=967 bgcolor=#E9E9E9
| 325967 ||  || — || September 21, 2001 || Socorro || LINEAR || — || align=right | 1.5 km || 
|-id=968 bgcolor=#fefefe
| 325968 ||  || — || August 22, 2003 || Campo Imperatore || CINEOS || — || align=right data-sort-value="0.99" | 990 m || 
|-id=969 bgcolor=#fefefe
| 325969 ||  || — || April 7, 2005 || Kitt Peak || Spacewatch || V || align=right data-sort-value="0.85" | 850 m || 
|-id=970 bgcolor=#d6d6d6
| 325970 ||  || — || January 4, 2006 || Kitt Peak || Spacewatch || — || align=right | 2.5 km || 
|-id=971 bgcolor=#fefefe
| 325971 ||  || — || September 28, 2006 || Kitt Peak || Spacewatch || FLO || align=right data-sort-value="0.64" | 640 m || 
|-id=972 bgcolor=#fefefe
| 325972 ||  || — || November 5, 2007 || Kitt Peak || Spacewatch || — || align=right data-sort-value="0.84" | 840 m || 
|-id=973 bgcolor=#E9E9E9
| 325973 Cardinal ||  ||  || December 13, 2006 || Mauna Kea || D. D. Balam || — || align=right | 2.5 km || 
|-id=974 bgcolor=#E9E9E9
| 325974 ||  || — || November 10, 2006 || Kitt Peak || Spacewatch || — || align=right | 1.1 km || 
|-id=975 bgcolor=#E9E9E9
| 325975 ||  || — || September 1, 2005 || Kitt Peak || Spacewatch || HOF || align=right | 2.4 km || 
|-id=976 bgcolor=#fefefe
| 325976 ||  || — || October 24, 2003 || Kitt Peak || Spacewatch || V || align=right data-sort-value="0.71" | 710 m || 
|-id=977 bgcolor=#E9E9E9
| 325977 ||  || — || March 28, 2008 || Mount Lemmon || Mount Lemmon Survey || — || align=right | 1.1 km || 
|-id=978 bgcolor=#fefefe
| 325978 ||  || — || November 11, 2007 || Mount Lemmon || Mount Lemmon Survey || ERI || align=right | 1.8 km || 
|-id=979 bgcolor=#E9E9E9
| 325979 ||  || — || November 25, 2006 || Kitt Peak || Spacewatch || — || align=right | 1.5 km || 
|-id=980 bgcolor=#d6d6d6
| 325980 ||  || — || December 24, 2005 || Kitt Peak || Spacewatch || THM || align=right | 2.3 km || 
|-id=981 bgcolor=#E9E9E9
| 325981 ||  || — || October 6, 2005 || Mount Lemmon || Mount Lemmon Survey || MRX || align=right | 1.1 km || 
|-id=982 bgcolor=#d6d6d6
| 325982 ||  || — || March 16, 2007 || Mount Lemmon || Mount Lemmon Survey || — || align=right | 2.2 km || 
|-id=983 bgcolor=#E9E9E9
| 325983 ||  || — || April 6, 2008 || Kitt Peak || Spacewatch || — || align=right | 1.8 km || 
|-id=984 bgcolor=#E9E9E9
| 325984 ||  || — || April 14, 2008 || Mount Lemmon || Mount Lemmon Survey || — || align=right data-sort-value="0.93" | 930 m || 
|-id=985 bgcolor=#fefefe
| 325985 ||  || — || May 7, 2002 || Palomar || NEAT || FLO || align=right data-sort-value="0.74" | 740 m || 
|-id=986 bgcolor=#E9E9E9
| 325986 ||  || — || October 21, 2001 || Kitt Peak || Spacewatch || — || align=right | 1.4 km || 
|-id=987 bgcolor=#fefefe
| 325987 ||  || — || February 11, 2004 || Palomar || NEAT || SUL || align=right | 2.3 km || 
|-id=988 bgcolor=#d6d6d6
| 325988 ||  || — || October 22, 2005 || Kitt Peak || Spacewatch || — || align=right | 2.8 km || 
|-id=989 bgcolor=#E9E9E9
| 325989 ||  || — || July 28, 2005 || Palomar || NEAT || — || align=right | 2.1 km || 
|-id=990 bgcolor=#d6d6d6
| 325990 ||  || — || October 7, 2004 || Anderson Mesa || LONEOS || HYG || align=right | 3.1 km || 
|-id=991 bgcolor=#d6d6d6
| 325991 ||  || — || October 5, 2004 || Three Buttes || G. R. Jones || EOS || align=right | 2.5 km || 
|-id=992 bgcolor=#d6d6d6
| 325992 ||  || — || November 3, 2004 || Palomar || NEAT || EUP || align=right | 4.2 km || 
|-id=993 bgcolor=#E9E9E9
| 325993 ||  || — || January 19, 2008 || Mount Lemmon || Mount Lemmon Survey || HNS || align=right | 1.5 km || 
|-id=994 bgcolor=#E9E9E9
| 325994 ||  || — || October 4, 1996 || Kitt Peak || Spacewatch || — || align=right | 2.7 km || 
|-id=995 bgcolor=#E9E9E9
| 325995 ||  || — || January 5, 2003 || Socorro || LINEAR || — || align=right | 2.4 km || 
|-id=996 bgcolor=#fefefe
| 325996 ||  || — || October 17, 2006 || Mount Lemmon || Mount Lemmon Survey || — || align=right | 1.1 km || 
|-id=997 bgcolor=#E9E9E9
| 325997 ||  || — || April 6, 2008 || Catalina || CSS || EUN || align=right | 1.3 km || 
|-id=998 bgcolor=#E9E9E9
| 325998 ||  || — || August 30, 2000 || Kitt Peak || Spacewatch || HOF || align=right | 2.8 km || 
|-id=999 bgcolor=#E9E9E9
| 325999 ||  || — || November 18, 2006 || Kitt Peak || Spacewatch || RAF || align=right | 1.6 km || 
|-id=000 bgcolor=#d6d6d6
| 326000 ||  || — || July 24, 2003 || Palomar || NEAT || — || align=right | 3.9 km || 
|}

References

External links 
 Discovery Circumstances: Numbered Minor Planets (325001)–(330000) (IAU Minor Planet Center)

0325